= Autosomal recessive cerebellar ataxia =

Autosomal recessive cerebellar ataxia (Orphanet 3711) describes a heterogeneous group of rare genetic disorders with an autosomal recessive inheritance pattern and a clinical phenotype involving cerebellar ataxia.

It may refer to:

- Autosomal recessive cerebellar ataxia type 1, a.k.a. autosomal recessive ataxia, Beauce type
- Autosomal recessive cerebelloparenchymal disorder type 3
- Dysequilibrium syndrome
- CAMOS syndrome
- Cerebellar ataxia, Cayman type
- Joubert syndrome with oculorenal defect
- Joubert syndrome
- Joubert syndrome with hepatic defect
- Orofaciodigital syndrome type 6
- Joubert syndrome with ocular defect
- Joubert syndrome with renal defect
- Joubert syndrome with Jeune asphyxiating thoracic dystrophy
- Autosomal recessive cerebellar ataxia due to CWF19L1 deficiency
- Congenital cerebellar ataxia due to RNU12 mutation
- Ataxia with vitamin E deficiency
- Abetalipoproteinemia
- Refsum disease
- Cerebrotendinous xanthomatosis
- Infantile Refsum disease
- Recessive mitochondrial ataxia syndrome
- Autosomal recessive ataxia due to PEX10 deficiency
- Autosomal recessive cerebellar ataxia with late-onset spasticity
- Autosomal recessive congenital cerebellar ataxia due to MGLUR1 deficiency
- Autosomal recessive congenital cerebellar ataxia due to GRID2 deficiency
- Ataxia-telangiectasia
- Ataxia-oculomotor apraxia type 1
- Spinocerebellar ataxia with axonal neuropathy type 2
- Spinocerebellar ataxia with axonal neuropathy type 1
- Xeroderma pigmentosum-Cockayne syndrome complex
- Ataxia-telangiectasia-like disorder
- Xeroderma pigmentosum
- RIDDLE syndrome
- Friedreich ataxia
- Early-onset cerebellar ataxia with retained tendon reflexes
- Infantile onset spinocerebellar ataxia
- Marinesco-Sjögren syndrome
- Congenital cataracts-facial dysmorphism-neuropathy syndrome
- Posterior column ataxia-retinitis pigmentosa syndrome
- Early-onset progressive encephalopathy-spastic ataxia-distal spinal muscular atrophy syndrome
- Autosomal recessive spinocerebellar ataxia-blindness-deafness syndrome, a.k.a. spinocerebellar ataxia, autosomal recessive 3 (SCAR3)
- Autosomal recessive cerebellar ataxia-saccadic intrusion syndrome
- Autosomal recessive cerebellar ataxia-psychomotor delay syndrome
- Ataxia-oculomotor apraxia type 4
- Gemignani syndrome, a.k.a. spinocerebellar ataxia-amyotrophy-deafness syndrome
- Cerebellar ataxia, neuropathy, vestibular areflexia syndrome (CANVAS)
- Acute infantile liver failure-cerebellar ataxia-peripheral sensory motor neuropathy syndrome, a.k.a. spinocerebellar ataxia, autosomal recessive 21 (SCAR21)
- Autosomal recessive ataxia due to ubiquinone deficiency
- Adult-onset autosomal recessive cerebellar ataxia
- Childhood-onset autosomal recessive slowly progressive spinocerebellar ataxia
- Infantile-onset autosomal recessive nonprogressive cerebellar ataxia, a.k.a. spinocerebellar ataxia, autosomal recessive 6 (SCAR6)
- Spectrin-associated autosomal recessive cerebellar ataxia
- Autosomal recessive cerebellar ataxia-epilepsy-intellectual disability syndrome due to WWOX deficiency
- Autosomal recessive cerebellar ataxia-epilepsy-intellectual disability syndrome due to TUD deficiency
- Autosomal recessive cerebellar ataxia-epilepsy-intellectual disability syndrome due to RUBCN deficiency
- Autosomal recessive cerebellar ataxia due to STUB1 deficiency
