= Ataxia with oculomotor apraxia type 1 =

- Other names: Early-onset ataxia with ocular motor apraxia and hypoalbuminemia
- Specialty: Neurology, Genetics
- Usual onset: Usually at the age of four
- Causes: Biallelic mutation in APTX gene.
- Treatment: Symptomatic

Ataxia with oculomotor apraxia type 1 (AOA1), also known as early-onset ataxia with ocular motor apraxia and hypoalbuminemia, is a rare autosomal recessive disorder caused by mutations in the APTX gene. AOA1 usually begins as uncoordinated movements and ataxia at the age of four but can start manifesting between ages two and ten. Also, they develop oculomotor apraxia, dysarthric speech, myoclonic jerks, chorea, cognitive impairment, and neuropathy. Elevated levels of cholesterol, creatine kinase, and decreased levels of albumin can be seen. Patients usually start using wheelchair after 11 years since the onset of the symptoms.

APTX gene codes for the protein Aprataxin, which might help DNA repair by the removal of adenylate groups from 5′-phosphate terminus at single-strand DNA nicks and gaps. It is most common in Japan and Portugal.

== Symptoms ==
In AOA1, patients usually experience oculomotor apraxia, problems with innitiation (oculocephalic dissociation) and slowing of saccades, nystagmus, failure of fixation, excessive blinking, ataxia, tremor, neuropathy (which leads to hyporeflexia, diminished sense of vibration, and limb weakness), atrophy of the cerebellum, decreased levels of albumin and elevated levels of cholesterol, dysarthric speech, chorea (which might disappear as disease progresses). Occasionally, patients experience scoliosis, intellectual disability, dystonia, head thrust, elevated levels of creatine kinase and alpha-fetoprotein. Rarely, patients experience parkinsonism, myoclonic jerks, and pyramidal signs. Oculomotor apraxia, head thrust, and oculocephalic dissociation might be associated with much severe form of this disorder.

Patients can experience subtle immune abnormalities such as lymphopenia of B- and T- cells (CD4+ and CD8+ T cells are affected), decreased levels of antibodies, low levels of T-cell receptor rearrangement excision circles and immunoglobulin κappa-deleting recombination excision circles, and lymphocytes are mildy sensetive to ionizing radiation.

== Diagnosis ==
Diagnosis can be suspected by symptoms and abnormalities in test, such as: atrophy of cerebellum on MRI, elevated levels of alpha-fetoprotein and cholesterol, neuropathic pattern on electromyography (procedure when a needle is inserted into a muscle in order to measure muscle activity caused by neurons). Consequently, diagnosis can be confirmed via genetic testing.

== Cause ==
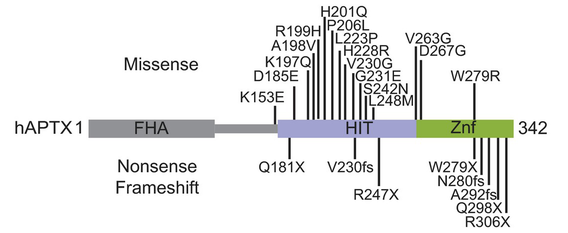
Mutations associated with AOA1; most of the mutations are located in the HIT or ZnF domains.

AOA1 is caused by biallelic mutation in APTX gene. Missense mutations (mutations that result in the change of amino acids in the specific location of the protein) usually result in much milder symptoms and delayed onset than truncating mutations. Founder effect was found in Japanese and Portuguese patients (V230fs and P206L are Japanese founder mutations; R199H and W279X are Portuguese founder mutations).

Monoallelic variants, in rare cases, can produce phenotype similar to multiple system atrophy.

== Pathophysiology ==
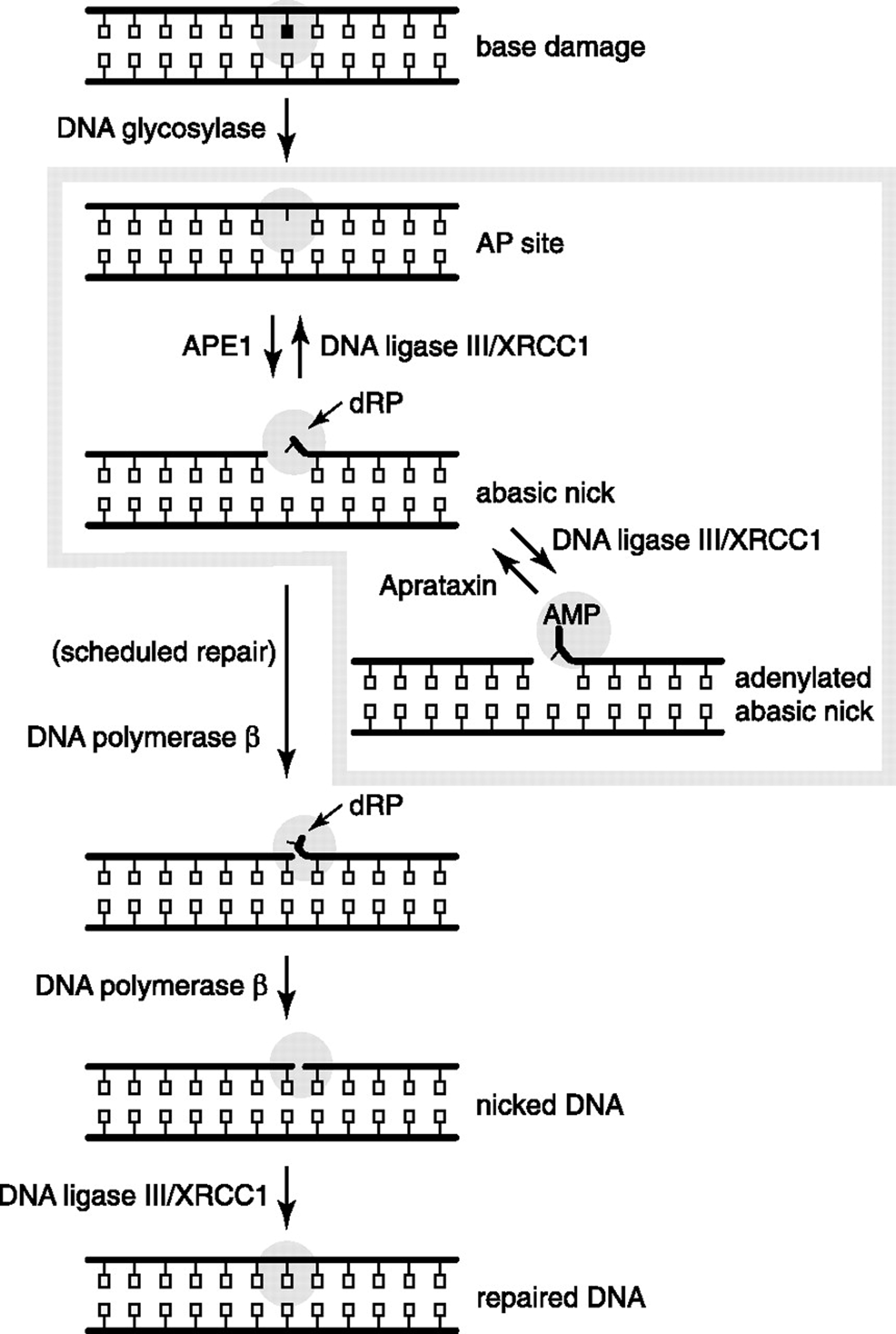
The damaged base (black) is removed by a monofunctional glycosylase to produce an abasic site (AP site). AP endonuclease 1 makes incision at the 5′-side of the AP site to generate an abasic nick with a deoxyribosephosphate residue (marked dRP) at the 5′ terminus. Untimely ligation reactions may be successful or could be abortive, leading to the formation of an adenylated abasic nick. Aprataxin can efficiently remove the adenylate to restore the abasic nick and allow subsequent re-entry into the BER pathway.

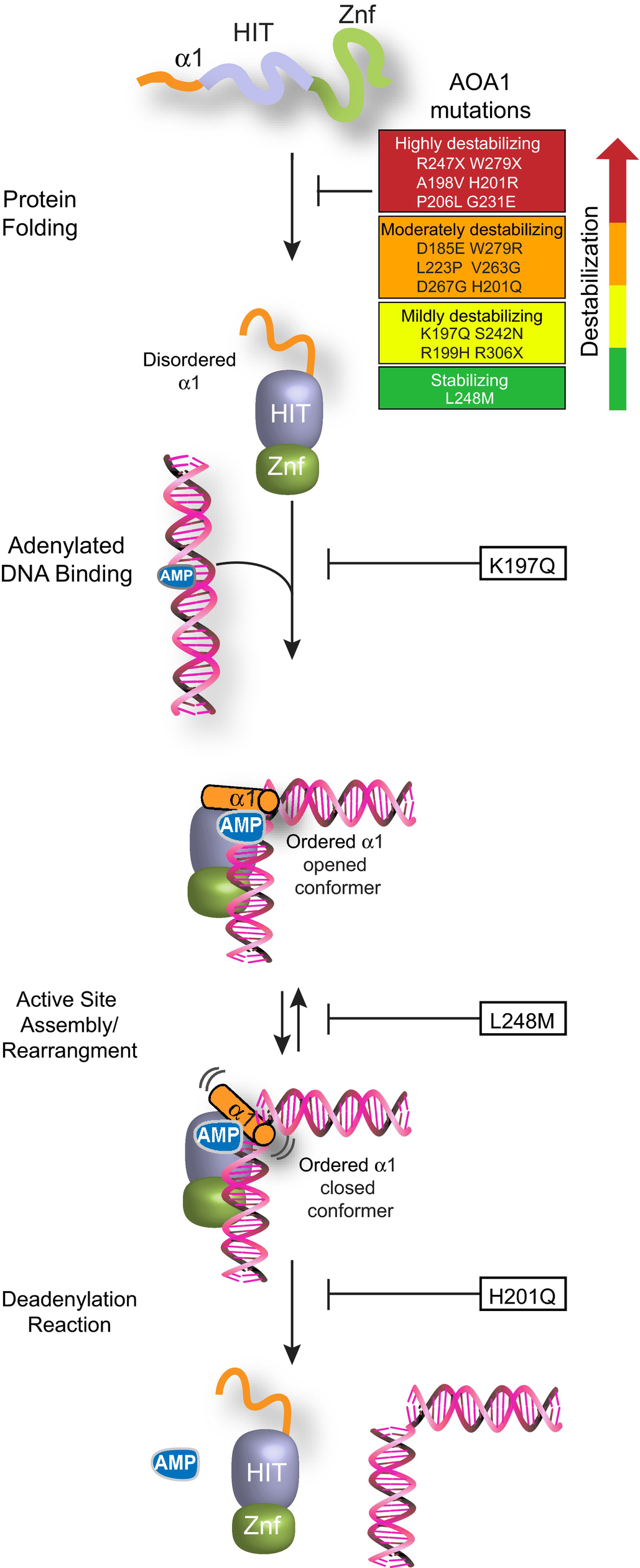
Aprataxin binds to adenylated site and rotates DNA by 90 degrees and consequently removes adenylate. Some mutations cause destabilisation of protein, and some cause impaired binding, rearrangement or deadenylation.

Aprataxin is 342 amino acids long and consists of FHA domain and HIT-ZnF catalyc core. It works by binding to adenylated DNA and removing AMP by catalytic side.

Aprataxin is localised in the nucleus and mitochondria, which means aprataxin participates in mitochondrial DNA repair. This protein participates in base excision repair (BER) by returning abortive DNA ligation into scheduled repair by DNA polymerase beta, which would remove 5'-deoxyribosephosphate residue (dRP) and fill the gap; consequently, DNA ligase III-XRCC1 complex would seal the gap; consequently this mechanism is hampered in AOA1. Also, it might participate in microhomology-mediated end joining (MMEJ) by associating with XRCC1 and DNA ligase III and safeguarding DNA from abortive ligations by DNA ligase I, which might, again, be hampered in AOA1. iPSC with AOA1-associated mutation showed hindered differentiation into neurons which could be responsinble for early onset. Additionally, these neurons showed increased levels of cleaved PARP1 and decreased levels of APEX1.

Due to the unique structure of chromatin in Purkinje cells, DNA damage (caused by aprataxin dysfunction) would hamper RNA polymerase II function, which would lead to improper splicing of some genes (such as: ITPR1, GRID2, CA8) and consequeent formation of R-loops; R-loops can exacerbate DNA damage. Because of dysregulation of genes, this would lead to ataxia. Decreased levels of albumin and elevated alpha-fetoprotein in AOA1 might be caused by transcriptional dysregulation in the liver.

== Treatment ==
Treatment is not specific and consists of management of symptoms. Management includes physical therapy for neuropathy and ataxia, educational guidance for writing and reading problems, and speech therapy for dysarthric speech and cognitive impairment. Lipid-lowering agents and low-cholesterol diet might be useed to control cholesterol levels.

== History ==
AOA1 was first described by Aicardi and colleagues in 1988. In 2001, Moreira and colleagues, and Date and colleaguees mapped the gene for AOA1 to 9p13 in Portuguese and Japanese populations.

== See also ==
- Oculomotor apraxia
- Ataxia-Telangiectasia
