= Placing reflexes =

Tests in veterinary medicine

There are two frequently used placing reflexes. They are tests which allow clinicians to assess the proprioceptive abilities of small domestic animals (cats and dogs in particular). The first test is to lift an animal and bring the anterior/dorsal surface of a paw up to a table edge. The normal animal will position its paw onto the surface properly. The second (sometimes called the proprioceptive positioning reflex) is similar. The dorsal (top) surface of an animals paw is placed onto a surface, and a fully healthy animal would flick it back up to be in the normal position (dorsal side up). If the animal cannot do this it implies that there is either a motor deficit or damage to the sensory pathway for proprioception, or damage to the centres of the brain which would normally integrate this response. These brain centres would include the cerebellum, and possibly (debated) portions of the cerebrum. There is no evidence to suggest whether the cerebrum is specifically involved with this reflex. Evidence for the involvement of the cerebellum comes, in part, from the fact that cerebellar ataxia can lead to a loss of this particular reflex.

It is sometimes referred to as a "response", to allow for possible conscious cerebral influence of the action. However, hopping and placing reactions, long loop stretch reflexes are probably integrated by the cerebral cortex. Decorticate animals show absence of this reflex.
