= Non-progressive congenital ataxia =

- Specialty: Neurology

Non-progressive congenital ataxia (NPCA) is a non-progressive form of cerebellar ataxia which can occur with or without cerebellar hypoplasia.

== Cause ==
NPCA is a syndrome and can have diverse causes. It has a genetic basis and inheritance is considered to be autosomal recessive. However, autosomal dominant variety has also been reported. There may be familial balanced translocation t(8;20)(p22;q13) involved.

== Diagnosis ==
Neuroimaging like MRI is important. However, there was considerable intrafamilial variability regarding neuroimaging, with some individuals showing normal MRI findings. Early individual prognosis of such autosomal recessive cerebellar ataxias is not possible from early developmental milestones, neurological signs, or neuroimaging.
