= Cerebellar ataxia, neuropathy, vestibular areflexia syndrome =

Cerebellar ataxia with neuropathy and vestibular areflexia syndrome
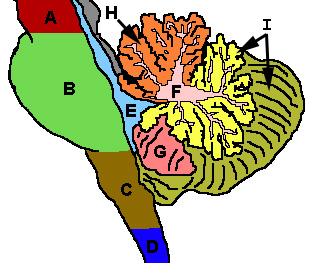
- Cerebellum and Brainstem
- Specialty: Neurology
- Symptoms: Difficulty walking, poor coordination, decreased sensation, chronic cough, dysphagia
- Usual onset: 40–60 years old
- Duration: Chronic
- Causes: Genetic
- Diagnostic method: Genetic testing
- Treatment: Supportive care, genetic counselling
- Frequency: Unknown

Cerebellar ataxia with neuropathy and vestibular areflexia syndrome (CANVAS) is an autosomal recessive late-onset heredodegenerative multisystem neurological disease. The syndrome is named from the main symptoms: cerebellar ataxia (CA), neuropathy (N), vestibular areflexia syndrome (VAS). Individuals with CANVAS often present with poor balance, difficulty walking, chronic cough, and difficulty swallowing. In genetically confirmed cases, the average age of onset was approximately 52 years. While first described in 2004, a genetic basis was not found till 2019, when a biallelic pentanucleotide expansion in the RFC1 gene was found to be a cause of CANVAS.

== Signs and symptoms ==
Symptoms of CANVAS can vary between affected individuals, but most cases present with some combination of cerebellar ataxia, neuropathy, and vestibular areflexia syndrome. Noticeable neurological changes generally first occur around 52 years but have been seen in individuals ranging from 19 to 72 years old. Individuals with CANVAS often lack coordination in their limbs and have trouble walking and speaking. Problems with the autonomic nervous system and vestibular dysfunction, including Oscillopsia are common. One of the first symptoms that individuals often notice is a chronic unexplained cough, that can precede other CANVAS symptoms by over three decades. CANVAS is a progressive syndrome, and new symptoms often occur, or symptoms worsen as the disease progresses. Symptoms such as cerebellar dysfunction, dysautonomia, and atrophy of the cerebellum can often appear later on in disease progression.

== Diagnosis ==
Historically, CANVAS diagnosis has been based solely on symptoms. With recent developments in genetic testing, allowing it to become more widespread and accessible, more individuals are being diagnosed with CANVAS based on the results of genetic testing. Physicians first consider if the patient has symptoms that align with a normal presentation of CANVAS before ordering genetic testing. Generally, a triad of vestibular deficit, cerebellar ataxia, and sensory neuropathy is an indicator of progressive ataxia, a category of neurological disorders that includes CANVAS. Symptoms of CANVAS can look similar to other genetic disorders, so physicians must carefully consider all symptoms and use genetic testing to confirm a diagnosis. The genetic tests look for AAGGG repeat expansion in the RFC1 gene. Genome sequencing must be used in the diagnosis of CANVAS rather than exome sequencing or sequence-based multigene panels because the genetic mutation that causes CANVAS is found in the noncoding regions of DNA.

== Prognosis ==
CANVAS generally progresses slowly. As symptoms progress increasingly more affected individuals require assistance moving. A specific study showed that 55% of affected individuals needing mobility aids 10 years after onset, and 25% needing a wheelchair after 15 years. Early impairments, such as vestibular areflexia and sensory neuropathy, contribute to falls, oscillopsia, and loss of proprioception. As the disease progresses, cerebellar ataxia and dysautonomia may further impact mobility and daily functioning. The progressive loss of independence can also lead to psychological challenges, including depression and anxiety.

== Treatment ==
There is no specific treatment for CANVAS. Treatment plans revolve around minimizing symptoms and maximizing comfort and function for affected individuals. Fall prevention is often one of the biggest goals in treatment plans for individuals with CANVAS, due to the lack of coordination in limbs and trouble walking that often presents with CANVAS.

Genetic counseling is an option for individuals with affected family members to understand the possible risk of them carrying the CANVAS mutation or their children inheriting CANVAS.

== Genetics ==
A majority of CANVAS cases have been found to be caused by a mutation in the replication factor C subunit 1 gene. CANVAS is typically inherited in an autosomal recessive manner, with both familial and sporadic cases having been documented. The specific mutation is known as a biallelic AAGGG expansion and is found in the second intron of the RFC1 gene. The AAGGG repeats replace the AAAAG sequence found in individuals without CANVAS. The number of times AAGGG is repeated in the gene does not appear to affect when or how symptoms appear. The number of AAGGG repeats have been estimated to range from 400 to over 2000 repeats.Similar mutations have also been found in other phenotypes with ataxia.

== Epidemiology ==
The prevalence of the disease is currently unknown, largely owing to its recent description and delineation from other forms of autosomal recessive cerebellar ataxia. It is more commonly identified in individuals of European ancestry, where approximately 0.7% to 1% carry biallelic RFC1 repeat expansions. Carrier frequency for a single pathogenic allele ranges from 4% to 7%. There is no clear difference in prevalence between males and females. Symptom onset typically occurs in middle to late adulthood, with an average age of 52 years and a reported range from 19 to 72 years. No pediatric cases have been described.
