= Thymic hypoplasia =

- Specialty: Medical genetics

Thymic hypoplasia is a condition where the thymus is underdeveloped or involuted.

== Causes ==
There are various causes of thymic hypoplasia such as 22q11.2 deletion syndrome, CHARGE syndrome, Nude/SCID and otofaciocervical syndrome type 2 (OTFCS2), and ataxia telangiectasia.
