= DNA ligase 1 =

Protein-coding gene in the species Homo sapiens

LIG1
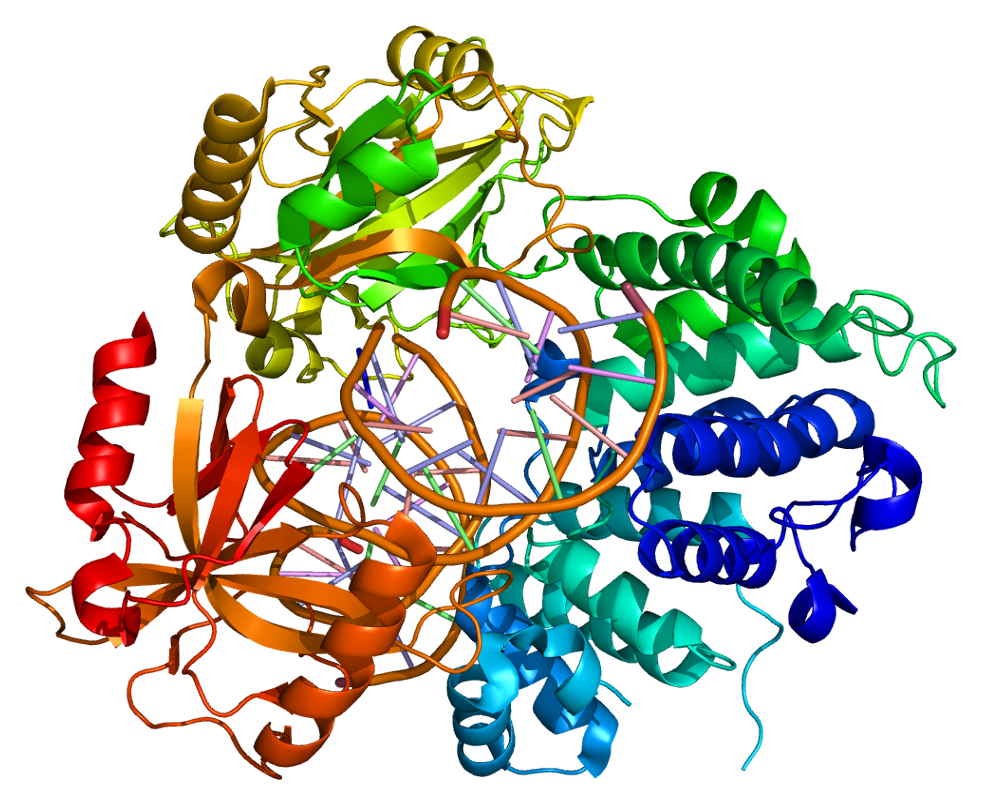

Identifiers
- Aliases: LIG1, DNA ligase 1, LIGI, hLig1, IMD96
- External IDs: OMIM: 126391; MGI: 101789; GeneCards: LIG1
Available structures
PDB	Ortholog search: PDBe RCSB
PDB	List of PDB id codes 1X9N
Enzyme activity
EC #	BRENDA	ExPASy	KEGG	MetaCyc
6.5.1.1	↗	↗	↗	↗

Gene location (Human)
Chr.	Chromosome 19 (human)
Band	19q13.33	Start	48,115,445 bp
Band	19q13.33	End	48,170,603 bp

Gene location (Mouse)
Chr.	Chromosome 7 (mouse)
Band	7 A1|7 7.82 cM	Start	13,011,239 bp
Band	7 A1|7 7.82 cM	End	13,045,350 bp
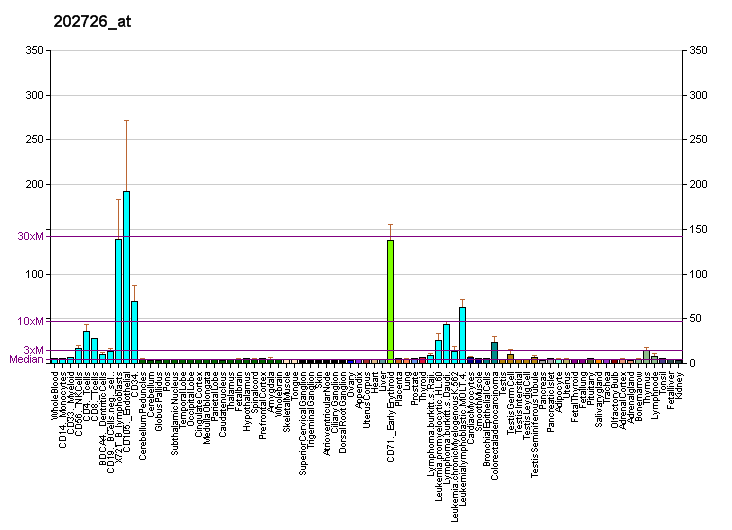
RNA expression pattern
Bgee	Human / Mouse (ortholog); Top expressed in: right uterine tube; ventricular zone; ganglionic eminence; sural nerve; mucosa of transverse colon; left testis; granulocyte; gonad; right testis; testicle / Top expressed in: tail of embryo; genital tubercle; outer renal medulla; fetal liver hematopoietic progenitor cell; inner renal medulla; primitive streak; epiblast; somite; yolk sac; maxillary prominence; More reference expression data
BioGPS	More reference expression data
Gene ontology
Molecular function	DNA binding; nucleotide binding; DNA ligase (ATP) activity; metal ion binding; ligase activity; ATP binding; DNA ligase activity
Cellular component	intracellular membrane-bounded organelle; nucleoplasm; mitochondrion; nucleus; cytoplasm
Biological process	nucleotide-excision repair, DNA gap filling; DNA recombination; DNA biosynthetic process; anatomical structure morphogenesis; Okazaki fragment processing involved in mitotic DNA replication; cellular response to DNA damage stimulus; cell division; DNA replication; V(D)J recombination; DNA mismatch repair; DNA ligation involved in DNA repair; cell cycle; transcription-coupled nucleotide-excision repair; DNA repair; base-excision repair; DNA ligation; lagging strand elongation
Sources:Amigo / QuickGO
Orthologs
Databases	NCBI: entry; OMA: entry
Species	Human	Mouse
Entrez	3978	16881
Ensembl	ENSG00000105486	ENSMUSG00000056394
UniProt	P18858	P37913
RefSeq (mRNA)	NM_000234; NM_001289063; NM_001289064; NM_001320970; NM_001320971	NM_001083188; NM_001199310; NM_010715
RefSeq (protein)	NP_000225; NP_001275992; NP_001275993; NP_001307899; NP_001307900	NP_001076657; NP_001186239; NP_034845
Location (UCSC)	Chr 19: 48.12 – 48.17 Mb	Chr 7: 13.01 – 13.05 Mb
PubMed search
- Wikidata
View/Edit Human	View/Edit Mouse

DNA ligase 1 also DNA ligase I, is an enzyme that in humans is encoded by the LIG1 gene. DNA ligase 1 is the only known eukaryotic DNA ligase involved in both DNA replication and repair, making it the most studied of the ligases.

== Discovery ==
It was known that DNA replication occurred through a double strand break, but the enzyme responsible for ligating the strands back together, and mechanism of action, was unknown until Lehman, Gellert, Richardson, and Hurwitz laboratories, made significant contributions to the discovery of DNA ligase in 1967.

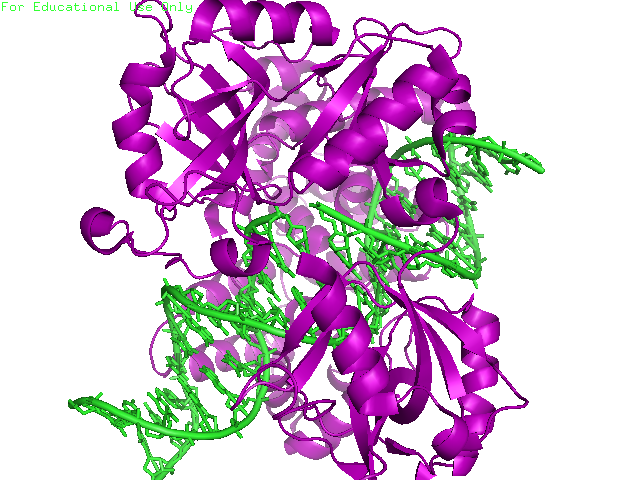
DNA Ligase I repairing nicked DNA

== Recruitment and regulation ==
LIG1 encodes a, 120kDa enzyme, 919 residues long, known as DNA ligase 1. The DNA ligase 1 polypeptide contains an N-terminal replication factory-targeting sequence (RFTS), followed by a nuclear localization sequence (NLS), and three functional domains. The three domains consist of an N-terminal DNA binding domain (DBD), and catalytic nucleotidyltransferase (NTase), and C-terminal oligonucleotide / oligosaccharide binding (OB) domains. Although the N-terminus of the peptide has no catalytic activity it is needed for activity within the cells. The N-terminus of the protein contains a replication factory-targeting sequence that is used to recruit it to sites of DNA replication known as replication factories.

Activation and recruitment of DNA ligase 1 seem to be associated with posttranslational modifications. N-terminal domain is completed through phosphorylation of four serine residues on this domain, Ser51, Ser76, and Ser91 by cyclin-dependent kinase (CDK) and Ser66 by casein kinase II (CKII). Phosphorylation of these residues (Ser66 in particular) has been shown to possibly regulate the interaction between the RFTS to the proliferating cell nuclear antigen (PCNA) when ligase 1 is recruited to the replication factories during S-phase. Rossi et al. proposed that when Ser66 is dephosphorylated, the RFTS of ligase 1 interact with PCNA, which was confirmed in vitro by Tom et al. Both data sets provide plausible evidence the N-terminal region of ligase I plays a regulatory role in the enzymes in vivo function in the nucleus. Moreover, the identification of a cyclin binding (Cy) motif in the catalytic C-terminus domain was shown by mutational analysis to play a role in the phosphorylation of serines 91 and 76. Together, the N-terminal serines are substrates of the CDK and CKII, which appear to play an important regulatory role DNA ligase I recruitment to the replication factory during S-phase of the cell cycle.

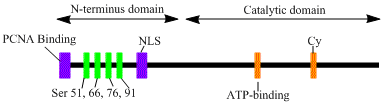
DNA ligase I LIG1 gene

== Function and mechanism ==
LIG1 encodes DNA ligase 1, which functions in DNA replication and the base excision repair process.

Eukaryotic DNA ligase 1 catalyzes a reaction that is chemically universal to all ligases. DNA ligase 1 utilizes adenosine triphosphate (ATP) to catalyze the energetically favorable ligation events in both DNA replication and repair. During the synthesis phase (S-phase) of the eukaryotic cell cycle, DNA replication occurs. DNA ligase 1 is responsible for joining Okazaki fragments formed during discontinuous DNA synthesis on the DNA's lagging strand after DNA polymerase δ has replaced the RNA primer nucleotides with DNA nucleotides. If the Okazaki fragments are not properly ligated together, the unligated DNA (containing a ‘nick’) could easily degrade to a double strand break, a phenomenon known to cause genetic mutations. In order to ligate these fragments together, the ligase progresses through three steps:

1. Addition of an adenosine monophosphate (AMP) group to the enzyme, referred to as adenylylation,
2. Adenosine monophosphate transfer to the DNA and
3. Nick sealing, or phosphodiester bond formation.

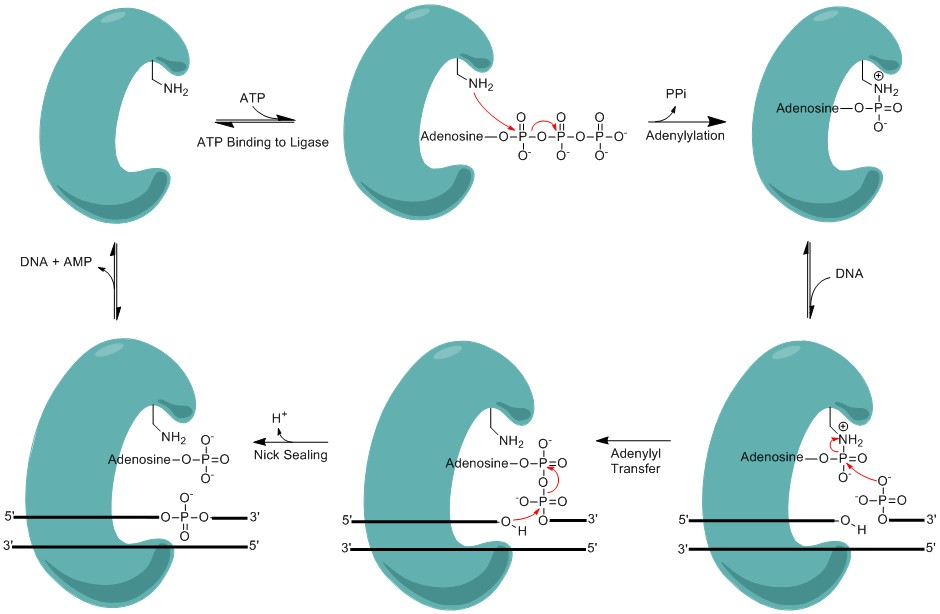
Minimalistic mechanism of DNA nick sealing by DNA ligase

During adenylylation, there is a nucleophilic attack on the alpha phosphate of ATP from a catalytic lysine resulting in the production of inorganic pyrophosphate (PPi) and a covalently bound lysine-AMP intermediate in the active site of DNA ligase 1.

During the AMP transfer step, the DNA ligase becomes associated with the DNA, locates a nick and catalyzes a reaction at the 5’ phosphate site of the DNA nick. An anionic oxygen on the 5’ phosphate of the DNA nick serves as the nucleophile, attacking the alpha phosphate of the covalently bound AMP causing the AMP to be covalently bound intermediate (DNA-AMP intermediate).

In order for the phosphodiester bond to be formed, the DNA-AMP intermediate must be cleaved off. To accomplish this task, there is a nucleophilic attack on the 5’-phosphate from the upstream 3’-hydroxyl which results in the formation of the phosphodiester bond. During this nucleophilic attack, the AMP group is pushed off the 5’ phosphate as the leaving group allowing for the nick to seal and the AMP to be released, completing one cycle of DNA ligation.

Under suboptimal conditions the ligase can disassociate from the DNA before the full reaction is complete. It has been shown that magnesium levels can slow the nick sealing process, causing the ligase to disassociate from the DNA, leaving an aborted adenylylated intermediate incapable of being fixed without the aid of a phosphodiesterase. Aprataxin (a phosphodiesterase) has been shown to act on aborted DNA intermediates via hydrolysis of the AMP-phosphate bond, restoring the DNA to its initial state before the ligase had reacted.

== Role in damaged base repair ==
Two pathways for Base Excision Repair (BER)

DNA ligase 1 functions to ligate single stranded DNA breaks in the final step of the base excision repair (BER) pathway. The nitrogenous bases of DNA are commonly damaged by environmental hazards such as reactive oxygen species, toxins, and ionizing radiation. BER is the major repair pathway responsible for excising and replacing damaged bases. Ligase I is involved in the LP-BER pathway, whereas ligase III is involved in the major SN-BER pathway(2). LP-BER proceeds in 4 catalytic steps. First, a DNA glycosylase cleaves the N-glycosidic bond, releasing the damaged base and creating an AP site– a site that lacks a purine or pyrimidine base. In the next step, an AP endonuclease creates a nick at the 5' end of the AP site, generating a hanging deoxyribose phosphate (dRP) residue in place of the AP site. DNA polymerase then synthesizes several new bases in the 5' to 3' direction, generating a hanging stretch of DNA with the dRP at its 5' end. It is at this step that SN-BER and LP-BER diverge in mechanism – in SNBER, only a single nucleotide is added and DNA Polymerase acts as a lyase to excise the AP site. In LP-BER, several bases are synthesized, generating a hanging flap of DNA, which is cleaved by a flap endonuclease. This leaves behind a nicked DNA strand that is sensed and ligated by DNA ligase. The action of ligase 1 is stimulated by other LP-BER enzymes, particularly AP-endonuclease and DNA polymerase.

== Clinical significance ==
Mutations in LIG1 that lead to DNA ligase 1 deficiency result in immunodeficiency and increased sensitivity to DNA-damaging agents.

There are rare reports of patients exhibiting ligase 1 deficiency which resulted from inherited mutant alleles. The first case manifested as stunted growth and development and an immunodeficiency. A mouse model was made based on cell lines derived from the patient, confirming that the mutant ligase confers replication errors leading to genomic instability. Notably the mutant mice also showed increases in tumorigenesis. Molecular, cellular, and clinical features of 5 patients from 3 kindreds with biallelic mutations were reported. The patients exhibited hypogammaglobulinemia, lymphopenia, increased proportions of circulating γδT cells, and very large red cells (macrocytosis.) Clinical severity ranged from a mild antibody deficiency to a combined immunodeficiency requiring hematopoietic stem cell transplantation. Chemical and radiation defects were demonstrated to impair the DNA repair pathways. Defects in DNA ligase 1 can thus lead to different forms of autosomal recessive, partial DNA ligase 1 deficiency leading to an immunodeficiency of variable severity.

Ligase I has also been found to be upregulated in proliferating tumor cells, as opposed to benign tumor cell lines and normal human cells. Furthermore, it has been shown that inhibiting ligase I expression in these cells can have a cytotoxic effect, suggesting that ligase I inhibitors may be viable chemotherapeutic agents.

Deficiencies in aprataxin, a phosphodiesterase responsible for reconditioning the DNA (after DNA ligase I aborts the adenylylated DNA intermediate), has been linked to neurodegeneration. This suggests that DNA is incapable of reentering the repair pathway without additional back-up machinery to correct for ligase errors.

With the structure of DNA being well known and many of the components necessary for its manipulation, repair, and usage becoming identified and characterized, researchers are beginning to look into the development of nanoscopic machinery that would be incorporated into a living organism that would possess the ability to treat diseases, fight cancer, and release medications based on a biological stimulus provided by the organism to the nanoscopic machinery. DNA ligase would most likely have to be incorporated into such a machine.
