= DNA ligase =

Class of enzymes

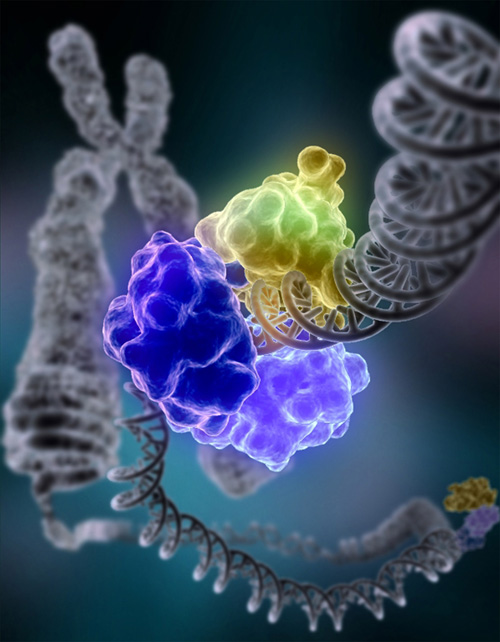
- Artist's conception of DNA ligase repairing chromosomal damage

Identifiers
- EC no.: 6.5.1.1
- CAS no.: 9015-85-4

Databases
- BRENDA: enzyme data
- ExPASy: NiceZyme view
- KEGG: enzyme entry
- MetaCyc: metabolic pathway
- Rhea: reactions
- PDB structures: RCSB PDB PDBe PDBsum
- Gene Ontology: AmiGO / QuickGO
Search
- PMC: articles
- PubMed: articles
- NCBI: proteins

ligase I, DNA, ATP-dependent
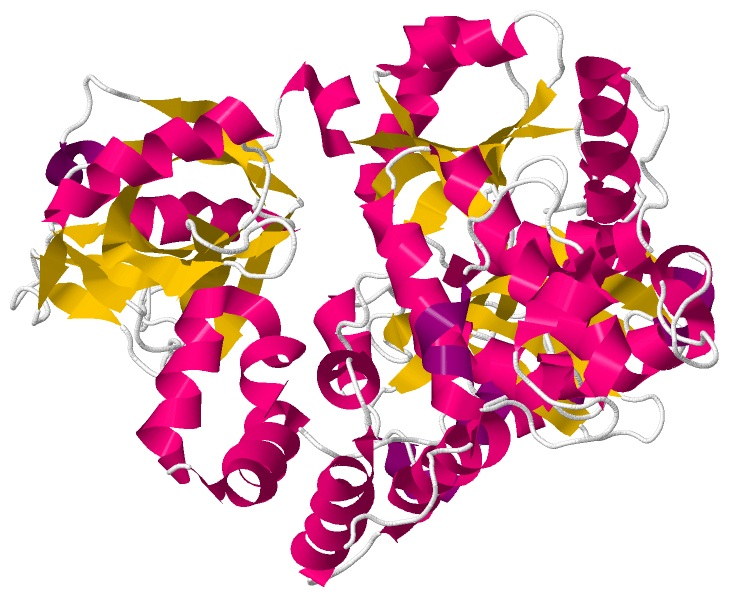

Identifiers
- Symbol: LIG1
- NCBI gene: 3978
- HGNC: 6598
- OMIM: 126391
- RefSeq: NM_000234
- UniProt: P18858

Other data
- Locus: Chr. 19
Search for
- Structures: Swiss-model
- Domains: InterPro

ligase III, DNA, ATP-dependent

Identifiers
- Symbol: LIG3
- NCBI gene: 3980
- HGNC: 6600
- OMIM: 600940
- RefSeq: NM_002311
- UniProt: P49916

Other data
- Locus: Chr. 17 q11.2-q12
Search for
- Structures: Swiss-model
- Domains: InterPro

DNA ligase is a type of enzyme that facilitates the joining of DNA strands together by catalyzing the formation of a phosphodiester bond. It plays a role in repairing single-strand breaks in duplex DNA in living organisms, but some forms (such as DNA ligase IV) may specifically repair double-strand breaks (i.e. a break in both complementary strands of DNA). Single-strand breaks are repaired by DNA ligase using the complementary strand of the double helix as a template, with DNA ligase creating the final phosphodiester bond to fully repair the DNA.

DNA ligase is used in both DNA repair and DNA replication (see Mammalian ligases). In addition, DNA ligase has extensive use in molecular biology laboratories for recombinant DNA experiments (see Research applications). Purified DNA ligase is used in gene cloning to join DNA molecules together to form recombinant DNA.

== Enzymatic mechanism ==
The image demonstrates how ligase (yellow oval) catalyzes two DNA fragment strands. The ligase joins the two fragments of DNA to form a longer strand of DNA by "pasting" them together.

The mechanism of DNA ligase is to form two covalent phosphodiester bonds between 3' hydroxyl ends of one nucleotide ("acceptor"), with the 5' phosphate end of another ("donor"). Two ATP molecules are consumed for each phosphodiester bond formed. AMP is required for the ligase reaction, which proceeds in four steps:

1. Reorganization of activity site such as nicks in DNA segments or Okazaki fragments etc.
2. Adenylylation (addition of AMP) of a lysine residue in the active center of the enzyme, pyrophosphate is released;
3. Transfer of the AMP to the 5' phosphate of the so-called donor, formation of a pyrophosphate bond;
4. Formation of a phosphodiester bond between the 5' phosphate of the donor and the 3' hydroxyl of the acceptor.

A pictorial example of how a ligase works (with sticky ends)

Ligase will also work with blunt ends, although higher enzyme concentrations and different reaction conditions are required.

== Types ==
=== e. coli ===
The E. coli DNA ligase is encoded by the lig gene. DNA ligase in E. coli, as well as most prokaryotes, uses energy gained by cleaving nicotinamide adenine dinucleotide (NAD) to create the phosphodiester bond. It does not ligate blunt-ended DNA except under conditions of molecular crowding with polyethylene glycol, and cannot join RNA to DNA efficiently.

The activity of E. coli DNA ligase can be enhanced by DNA polymerase at the right concentrations. Enhancement only works when the concentrations of the DNA polymerase 1 are much lower than the DNA fragments to be ligated. When the concentrations of Pol I DNA polymerases are higher, it has an adverse effect on E. coli DNA ligase

=== T4 ===
The DNA ligase from bacteriophage T4 (a bacteriophage that infects Escherichia coli bacteria). The T4 ligase is the most-commonly used in laboratory research. It can ligate either cohesive or blunt ends of DNA, oligonucleotides, as well as RNA and RNA-DNA hybrids, but not single-stranded nucleic acids. It can also ligate blunt-ended DNA with much greater efficiency than E. coli DNA ligase. Unlike E. coli DNA ligase, T4 DNA ligase cannot utilize NAD and it has an absolute requirement for ATP as a cofactor. Some engineering has been done to improve the in vitro activity of T4 DNA ligase; one successful approach, for example, tested T4 DNA ligase fused to several alternative DNA binding proteins and found that the constructs with either p50 or NF-kB as fusion partners were over 160% more active in blunt-end ligations for cloning purposes than wild type T4 DNA ligase. A typical reaction for inserting a fragment into a plasmid vector would use about 0.01 (sticky ends) to 1 (blunt ends) units of ligase. The optimal incubation temperature for T4 DNA ligase is 37 °C, a temperature at which T4 enzymes are most active. However, it is not uncommon to setup ligation reactions at 16 °C, a trade-off temperature at which the ligase is active as well as one that is suitable for base-pairing of sticky ends.

Bacteriophage T4 ligase mutants have increased sensitivity to both UV irradiation and the alkylating agent methyl methanesulfonate indicating that DNA ligase is employed in the repair of the DNA damages caused by these agents.

=== Mammalian ===
In mammals, there are four specific types of ligase.

1. DNA ligase 1: ligates the nascent DNA of the lagging strand after the Ribonuclease H has removed the RNA primer from the Okazaki fragments.
2. DNA ligase 3: complexes with DNA repair protein XRCC1 to aid in sealing DNA during the process of nucleotide excision repair and recombinant fragments. Of all the known mammalian DNA ligases, only ligase 3 has been found to be present in mitochondria.
3. DNA ligase 4: complexes with XRCC4. It catalyzes the final step in the non-homologous end joining DNA double-strand break repair pathway. It is also required for V(D)J recombination, the process that generates diversity in immunoglobulin and T-cell receptor loci during immune system development.
- DNA ligase 2: A purification artifact resulting from proteolytic degradation of DNA ligase 3. Initially, it has been recognized as another DNA ligase and it is the reason for the unusual nomenclature of DNA ligases.

DNA ligase from eukaryotes and some microbes uses adenosine triphosphate (ATP) rather than NAD.

=== Thermostable ===
Derived from a thermophilic bacterium, the enzyme is stable and active at much higher temperatures than conventional DNA ligases. Its half-life is 48 hours at 65 °C and greater than 1 hour at 95 °C. Ampligase DNA Ligase has been shown to be active for at least 500 thermal cycles (94 °C/80 °C) or 16 hours of cycling.^{10} This exceptional thermostability permits extremely high hybridization stringency and ligation specificity.

== Measurement of activity ==
There are at least three different units used to measure the activity of DNA ligase:

- Weiss unit - the amount of ligase that catalyzes the exchange of 1 nmole of ^{32}P from inorganic pyrophosphate to ATP in 20 minutes at 37^{°}C. This is the one most commonly used.
- Modrich-Lehman unit - this is rarely used, and one unit is defined as the amount of enzyme required to convert 100 nmoles of d(A-T)_{n} to an exonuclease-III resistant form in 30 minutes under standard conditions.
- Many commercial suppliers of ligases use an arbitrary unit based on the ability of ligase to ligate cohesive ends. These units are often more subjective than quantitative and lack precision.

== Research applications ==
DNA ligases have become indispensable tools in modern molecular biology research for generating recombinant DNA sequences. For example, DNA ligases are used with restriction enzymes to insert DNA fragments, often genes, into plasmids.

Controlling the optimal temperature is a vital aspect of performing efficient recombination experiments involving the ligation of cohesive-ended fragments. Most experiments use T4 DNA Ligase (isolated from bacteriophage T4), which is most active at 37 °C. However, for optimal ligation efficiency with cohesive-ended fragments ("sticky ends"), the optimal enzyme temperature needs to be balanced with the melting temperature T_{m} of the sticky ends being ligated, the homologous pairing of the sticky ends will not be stable because the high temperature disrupts hydrogen bonding. A ligation reaction is most efficient when the sticky ends are already stably annealed, and disruption of the annealing ends would therefore result in low ligation efficiency. The shorter the overhang, the lower the T_{m}.

Since blunt-ended DNA fragments have no cohesive ends to anneal, the melting temperature is not a factor to consider within the normal temperature range of the ligation reaction. The limiting factor in blunt end ligation is not the activity of the ligase but rather the number of alignments between DNA fragment ends that occur. The most efficient ligation temperature for blunt-ended DNA would therefore be the temperature at which the greatest number of alignments can occur. The majority of blunt-ended ligations are carried out at 14-25 °C overnight. The absence of stably annealed ends also means that the ligation efficiency is lowered, requiring a higher ligase concentration to be used.

A novel use of DNA ligase can be seen in the field of nano chemistry, specifically in DNA origami. DNA based self-assembly principles have proven useful for organizing nanoscale objects, such as biomolecules, nanomachines, nanoelectronic and photonic component. Assembly of such nano structure requires the creation of an intricate mesh of DNA molecules. Although DNA self-assembly is possible without any outside help using different substrates such as provision of catatonic surface of Aluminium foil, DNA ligase can provide the enzymatic assistance that is required to make DNA lattice structure from DNA over hangs.

== History ==
The first DNA ligase was purified and characterized in 1967 by the Gellert, Lehman, Richardson, and Hurwitz laboratories. It was first purified and characterized by Weiss and Richardson using a six-step chromatographic-fractionation process beginning with elimination of cell debris and addition of streptomycin, followed by several Diethylaminoethyl (DEAE)-cellulose column washes and a final phosphocellulose fractionation. The final extract contained 10% of the activity initially recorded in the E. coli media; along the process it was discovered that ATP and Mg++ were necessary to optimize the reaction. The common commercially available DNA ligases were originally discovered in bacteriophage T4, E. coli and other bacteria.

== Disorders ==
Genetic deficiencies in human DNA ligases have been associated with clinical syndromes marked by immunodeficiency, radiation sensitivity, and developmental abnormalities, LIG4 syndrome (Ligase IV syndrome) is a rare disease associated with mutations in DNA ligase 4 and interferes with dsDNA break-repair mechanisms. Ligase IV syndrome causes immunodeficiency in individuals and is commonly associated with microcephaly and marrow hypoplasia. A list of prevalent diseases caused by lack of or malfunctioning of DNA ligase is as follows.

=== Xeroderma pigmentosum ===
Xeroderma pigmentosum, which is commonly known as XP, is an inherited condition characterized by an extreme sensitivity to ultraviolet (UV) rays from sunlight. This condition mostly affects the eyes and areas of skin exposed to the sun. Some affected individuals also have problems involving the nervous system.

=== Ataxia-telangiectasia ===
Mutations in the ATM gene cause ataxia–telangiectasia. The ATM gene provides instructions for making a protein that helps control cell division and is involved in DNA repair. This protein plays an important role in the normal development and activity of several body systems, including the nervous system and immune system. The ATM protein assists cells in recognizing damaged or broken DNA strands and coordinates DNA repair by activating enzymes that fix the broken strands. Efficient repair of damaged DNA strands helps maintain the stability of the cell's genetic information. Affected children typically develop difficulty walking, problems with balance and hand coordination, involuntary jerking movements (chorea), muscle twitches (myoclonus), and disturbances in nerve function (neuropathy). The movement problems typically cause people to require wheelchair assistance by adolescence. People with this disorder also have slurred speech and trouble moving their eyes to look side-to-side (oculomotor apraxia).

=== Fanconi anemia ===
Fanconi anemia (FA) is a rare, inherited blood disorder that leads to bone marrow failure. FA prevents bone marrow from making enough new blood cells for the body to work normally. FA also can cause the bone marrow to make many faulty blood cells. This can lead to serious health problems, such as leukemia.

=== Bloom syndrome ===
Bloom syndrome results in skin that is sensitive to sun exposure, and usually the development of a butterfly-shaped patch of reddened skin across the nose and cheeks. A skin rash can also appear on other areas that are typically exposed to the sun, such as the back of the hands and the forearms. Small clusters of enlarged blood vessels (telangiectases) often appear in the rash; telangiectases can also occur in the eyes. Other skin features include patches of skin that are lighter or darker than the surrounding areas (hypopigmentation or hyperpigmentation respectively). These patches appear on areas of the skin that are not exposed to the sun, and their development is not related to the rashes.

== As a drug target ==
In recent studies, human DNA ligase I was used in Computer-aided drug design to identify DNA ligase inhibitors as possible therapeutic agents to treat cancer. Since excessive cell growth is a hallmark of cancer development, targeted chemotherapy that disrupts the functioning of DNA ligase can impede adjuvant cancer forms. Furthermore, it has been shown that DNA ligases can be broadly divided into two categories, namely, ATP- and NAD^{+}-dependent. Previous research has shown that although NAD^{+}-dependent DNA ligases have been discovered in sporadic cellular or viral niches outside the bacterial domain of life, there is no instance in which a NAD^{+}-dependent ligase is present in a eukaryotic organism. The presence solely in non-eukaryotic organisms, unique substrate specificity, and distinctive domain structure of NAD+ dependent compared with ATP-dependent human DNA ligases together make NAD^{+}-dependent ligases ideal targets for the development of new antibacterial drugs.

== See also ==
- DNA end
- Lagging strand
- DNA replication
- Okazaki fragment
- DNA polymerase
- Sequencing by ligation
