= Denise Louis-Bar =

Belgium neuropsychiatrist

Denise Louis–Bar
- Born: Denise Bar; 3 April 1914; Liège, Belgium
- Died: 2 November 1999 (aged 85); Brussels, Belgium
- Citizenship: Belgium
- Education: Free University of Brussels
- Known for: Louis-Bar syndrome
- Scientific career
- Fields: Neurology, Neuropsychiatry

Denise Louis-Bar was a Belgian neuropsychiatrist. Louis-Bar syndrome, an autosomal recessive neurodegenerative disorder is named after her.

== Biography ==
Denise Bar was born on April 3, 1914, in Liège, Belgium. She lived in Spain with her family until the age of 10.

In 1939 Denise completed her master's degree, with a joint degree in éducation physique (physical education) from the Free University of Brussels.

Within a month of her marriage to Louise, they moved to the Ardennes after her husband had to join a Belgian army unit there. Denise had intended to practice general medicine immediately after graduating from medical school, but the difficulties of starting a private medical practice while her husband was in the army and the outbreak of World War II forced her to change her mind and decided to specialise in neurology, enrolling at the Bung Institute in Antwerp, Belgium. In 1940 Denise completed her residency at the Bunge Institute of Neurology, Antwerp. There she trained under neuropathologist Ludo van Bogaert. Later she worked as a lecturer in pharmacology, and later as neuropsychiatrist in the department of internal medicine at the University of Liège.

She did not remain in the field of neuro research for long. When her husband moved to Belgium in 1957 to join director of the Belgian Office of Study of Nuclear Energy, the family moved to Brussels, she stopped her career in research and moved into private practice, particularly, she worked as a neuropsychiatrist treating individuals with intellectual disabilities. During the time of private practice in Brussels, Denise initiated to start twelve centers for patients with mental disabilities, including two model centers: Entraide des Travailleuses, a day-care center for pediatric rehabilitation and Centre de Réadaptation de l'Enfance à Bruxelles affiliated with the UCLouvain Medical School.

Denise Louis-Bar died on November 2, 1999, at Brussels.

=== Personal life ===
Her spouse F. Louis was a civil engineer trained at the Faculté polytechnique de Mons of the Catholic University of Louvain, Belgium.

== Legacy ==
Louis-Bar syndrome, an autosomal recessive neurodegenerative disorder is named after her. She first described the condition in 1941. Elizabeth A. Coon, who published a paper on Denise Louis-Bar's life in the journal Neurology in 2018, received the AAN McHenry Award in History for this article.

== Major publications ==
- "Sur un syndrome progressif comprenant des télangiectasies capillaires cutanées et conjonctivales symétriques, à disposition naevoïde et des troubles cérébelleux". Confinia Neurologica. 4 (1–2): 32–42. 2009-06-26. doi:10.1159/000106149. ISSN 0010-5678.
- Louis-Bar, D. (1946). "[On the semiology and pathological anatomy of the cavernous and telangiectatic angiomatosis of the nervous centers]". Monatsschrift für Psychiatrie und Neurologie. 111 (5–6): 225–272. ISSN 0369-1519. PMID 20990322.
- Louis-Bar, D. (1946). "[On hemibulb vascular syndrome (Wallenberg)]". Monatsschrift für Psychiatrie und Neurologie. 112 (1–2): 53–107. ISSN 0369-1519. PMID 20291844.
- Louis-Bar, D. (1946). "[On the inheritance of Sturge-Weber-Krabbe disease]". Confinia Neurologica. 7 (5): 238–244. ISSN 0010-5678. PMID 20258212.
- Louis-Bar, D. (1 March 1952). "[Paralysis of cyclists]". Revue Médicale de Liège. 7 (3): 82–83. ISSN 0370-629X. PMID 14930495.
- Louis-Bar, D. (15 May 1952). "[Two cases of narcolepsy]". Revue Médicale de Liège. 7 (10): 312–313. ISSN 0370-629X. PMID 14949776.
- Louis-Bar, D.; Keil, C. (1954-06-15). "[Essential epilepsy]". Revue Médicale de Liège. 9 (12): 359–363. ISSN 0370-629X. PMID 13178347.
- Louis-Bar, D. (September 1964). "The Interview with the Parents". Acta Neurologica et Psychiatrica Belgica. 64: 934–941. ISSN 0001-6284. PMID 14248197.
