= Dysequilibrium syndrome =

Dysequilibrium syndrome may refer to:

- Cerebellar ataxia, mental retardation, and dysequilibrium syndrome 1 (CAMRQ1), an autosomal recessive cerebellar ataxia associated with the VLDLR gene
- Cerebellar ataxia, mental retardation, and dysequilibrium syndrome 2 (CAMRQ2), an autosomal recessive cerebellar ataxia associated with the WDR81 gene
- Cerebellar ataxia, mental retardation, and dysequilibrium syndrome 3 (CAMRQ3), an autosomal recessive cerebellar ataxia associated with the CA8 gene
- Cerebellar ataxia, mental retardation, and dysequilibrium syndrome 4 (CAMRQ4), an autosomal recessive cerebellar ataxia associated with the ATP8A2 gene
