= DNA ligase 3 =

Protein-coding gene in the species Homo sapiens

LIG3
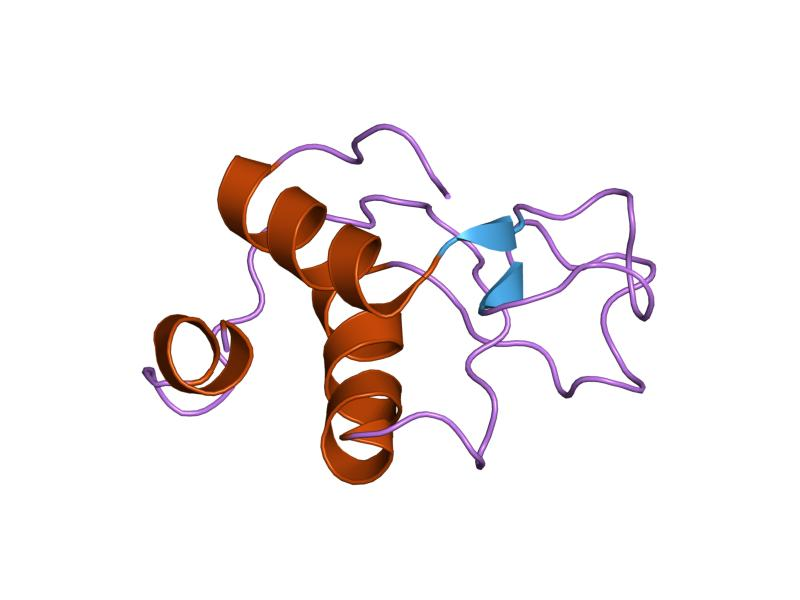

Identifiers
- Aliases: LIG3, LIG2, DNA ligase 3, LIG3alpha, MTDPS20
- External IDs: OMIM: 600940; MGI: 109152; GeneCards: LIG3
Available structures
PDB	Ortholog search: PDBe RCSB
PDB	List of PDB id codes 1IMO, 1IN1, 1UW0, 3L2P, 3PC7, 3PC8, 3QVG
Enzyme activity
EC #	BRENDA	ExPASy	KEGG	MetaCyc
6.5.1.1	↗	↗	↗	↗

Gene location (Human)
Chr.	Chromosome 17 (human)
Band	17q12	Start	34,980,512 bp
Band	17q12	End	35,009,743 bp

Gene location (Mouse)
Chr.	Chromosome 11 (mouse)
Band	11 C|11 50.23 cM	Start	82,671,934 bp
Band	11 C|11 50.23 cM	End	82,695,100 bp
RNA expression pattern
Bgee	Human / Mouse (ortholog); Top expressed in: buccal mucosa cell; internal globus pallidus; epithelium of colon; ganglionic eminence; sural nerve; body of uterus; right testis; left testis; ventricular zone; right uterine tube / Top expressed in: gastrula; spermatocyte; spermatid; seminiferous tubule; genital tubercle; secondary oocyte; ventricular zone; zygote; tail of embryo; submandibular gland; More reference expression data
BioGPS	n/a
Gene ontology
Molecular function	DNA binding; nucleotide binding; zinc ion binding; metal ion binding; ligase activity; protein binding; DNA ligase activity; ATP binding; DNA ligase (ATP) activity
Cellular component	DNA ligase III-XRCC1 complex; nucleoplasm; nucleus; mitochondrion; cytoplasm
Biological process	nucleotide-excision repair, DNA gap filling; DNA recombination; lagging strand elongation; DNA biosynthetic process; mitochondrial DNA repair; mitochondrion organization; double-strand break repair via alternative nonhomologous end joining; negative regulation of mitochondrial DNA replication; cellular response to DNA damage stimulus; cell division; DNA ligation; DNA replication; double-strand break repair via homologous recombination; V(D)J recombination; DNA ligation involved in DNA repair; cell cycle; transcription-coupled nucleotide-excision repair; double-strand break repair; DNA repair; base-excision repair, DNA ligation
Sources:Amigo / QuickGO
Orthologs
Databases	NCBI: entry; OMA: entry
Species	Human	Mouse
Entrez	3980	16882
Ensembl	ENSG00000005156	ENSMUSG00000020697
UniProt	P49916	P97386
RefSeq (mRNA)	NM_002311; NM_013975	NM_001291245; NM_001291246; NM_001291247; NM_010716
RefSeq (protein)	NP_002302; NP_039269	n/a
Location (UCSC)	Chr 17: 34.98 – 35.01 Mb	Chr 11: 82.67 – 82.7 Mb
PubMed search
- Wikidata
View/Edit Human	View/Edit Mouse

DNA ligase 3 also DNA ligase III, is an enzyme that, in humans, is encoded by the LIG3 gene. LIG3 encodes ATP-dependent DNA ligases that seal interruptions in the phosphodiester backbone of duplex DNA.

There are three families of ATP-dependent DNA ligases in eukaryotes. These enzymes utilize the same three step reaction mechanism; (i) formation of a covalent enzyme-adenylate intermediate; (ii) transfer of the adenylate group to the 5' phosphate terminus of a DNA nick; (iii) phosphodiester bond formation. Unlike LIG1 and LIG4 family members that are found in almost all eukaryotes, LIG3 family members are less widely distributed. LIG3 encodes several distinct DNA ligase species by alternative translation initiation and alternative splicing mechanisms that are described below.

== Structure, DNA binding and catalytic activities ==
Eukaryotic ATP-dependent DNA ligases have related catalytic region that contains three domains, a DNA binding domain, an adenylation domain and an oligonucleotide / oligosaccharide binding-fold domain. When these enzymes engage a nick in duplex DNA, these domains encircle the DNA duplex with each one making contact with the DNA. The structure of the catalytic region of DNA ligase III complexed with a nicked DNA has been determined by X-ray crystallography and is remarkably similar to that formed by the catalytic region of human DNA ligase I bound to nicked DNA. A unique feature of the DNA ligases encoded by the LIG3 gene is an N-terminal zinc finger that resembles the two zinc fingers at the N-terminus of poly (ADP-ribose) polymerase 1 (PARP1). As with the PARP1 zinc fingers, the DNA ligase III zinc finger is involved in binding to DNA strand breaks. Within the DNA ligase III polypeptide, the zinc finger co-operates with the DNA binding domain to form a DNA binding module. In addition, the adenylation domain and an oligonucleotide/oligosaccharide binding-fold domain form a second DNA binding module. In the jackknife model proposed by the Ellenberger laboratory, the zinc finger-DNA binding domain module serves as a strand break sensor that binds to DNA single strand interruptions irrespective of the nature of the strand break termini. If these breaks are ligatable, they are transferred to the adenylation domain-oligonucleotide/oligosaccharide binding-fold domain module that binds specifically to ligatable nicks. Compared with DNA ligases I and IV, DNA ligase III is the most active enzyme in the intermolecular joining of DNA duplexes. This activity is predominantly dependent upon the DNA ligase III zinc finger suggesting that the two DNA binding modules of DNA ligase III may be able to simultaneously engage duplex DNA ends.

== Alternative splicing ==
The alternative translation initiation and splicing mechanisms alter the amino- and carboxy-terminal sequences that flank the DNA ligase III catalytic region. In the alternative splicing mechanism, the exon encoding a C-terminal breast cancer susceptibility protein 1 C-terminal (BRCT) domain at the C-terminus of DNA ligase III-alpha is replaced by a short positively charged sequence that acts as a nuclear localization signal, generating DNA ligase III-beta. This alternatively spliced variant has, to date, only been detected in male germs cells. Based on its expression pattern during spermatogenesis, it appears likely that DNA ligase IIIbeta is involved in meiotic recombination and/or DNA repair in haploid sperm but this has not been definitively demonstrated. Although an internal ATG is the preferred site for translation initiation within the DNA ligase III open reading frame, translation initiations does also occur at the first ATG within the open reading frame, resulting in the synthesis of a polypeptide with an N-terminal mitochondrial targeting sequence.

== Cellular function ==
As mentioned above, DNA ligase III-alpha mRNA encodes nuclear and mitochondrial versions of DNA ligase III-alpha. Nuclear DNA ligase III-alpha exists and functions in a stable complex with the DNA repair protein XRCC1. These proteins interact via their C-terminal BRCT domains. XRCC1 has no enzymatic activity but instead appears to acts as a scaffold protein by interacting with a large number of proteins involved in base excision and single-strand break repair. The participation of XRCC1 in these pathways is consistent with the phenotype of xrcc1 cells. In contrast to nuclear DNA ligase III-alpha, mitochondrial DNA ligase III-alpha functions independently of XRCC1, which is not found in mitochondria. It appears that nuclear DNA ligase III-alpha forms a complex with XRCC1 in the cytoplasm and the subsequent nuclear targeting of the resultant complex is directed by the XRCC1 nuclear localization signal. While mitochondrial DNA ligase III-alpha also interacts with XRCC1, it is likely that the activity of the mitochondrial targeting sequence of DNA ligase III-alpha is greater than the activity of the XRCC1 nuclear localization signal and that the DNA ligase III-alpha/XRCC1 complex is disrupted when mitochondrial DNA ligase III-alpha passes through the mitochondrial membrane.

Since the LIG3 gene encodes the only DNA ligase in mitochondria, inactivation of the LIG3 gene results in loss of mitochondrial DNA that in turn leads to loss of mitochondrial function. Fibroblasts with inactivated Lig3 gene can be propagated in the media supplemented with uridine and pyruvate. However, these cells lack mtDNA. Physiological levels of mitochondrial DNA ligase III appear excessive, and cells with 100-fold reduced mitochondrial content of mitochondrial DNA ligase III-alpha maintain normal mtDNA copy number. The essential role of DNA ligase III-alpha in mitochondrial DNA metabolism can be fulfilled by other DNA ligases, including the NAD-dependent DNA ligase of E. coli, if they are targeted to mitochondria. Thus, viable cells that lack nuclear DNA ligase III-alpha can be generated. While DNA ligase I is the predominant enzyme that joins Okazaki fragments during DNA replication, it is now evident that the DNA ligase III-alpha/XRCC1 complex enables cells that either lack or have reduced DNA ligase I activity to complete DNA replication. Given the biochemical and cell biology studies linking the DNA ligase III-alpha/XRCC1 complex with excision repair and the repair of DNA single strand breaks, it was surprising that the cells lacking nuclear DNA ligase III-alpha did not exhibit significantly increased sensitivity to DNA damaging agent. These studies suggest that there is significant functional redundancy between DNA ligase I and DNA ligase III-alpha in these nuclear DNA repair pathways. In mammalian cells, most DNA double strand breaks are repaired by DNA ligase IV-dependent non-homologous end joining (NHEJ). DNA ligase III-alpha participates in a minor alternative NHEJ pathway that generates chromosomal translocations. Unlike the other nuclear DNA repair functions, it appears that the role of DNA ligase III-alpha in alternative NHEJ is independent of XRCC1.

== Clinical significance ==
Unlike the LIG1 and LIG4 genes, inherited mutations in the LIG3 gene have not been identified in the human population. DNA ligase III-alpha has, however, been indirectly implicated in cancer and neurodegenerative diseases. In cancer, DNA ligase III-alpha is frequently overexpressed and this serves as a biomarker to identify cells that are more dependent upon the alternative NHEJ pathway for the repair of DNA double strand breaks. Although the increased activity of the alternative NHEJ pathway causes genomic instability that drives disease progression, it also constitutes a novel target for the development of cancer cell-specific therapeutic strategies. Several genes encoding proteins that interact directly with DNA ligase III-alpha or indirectly via interactions with XRCC1 have been identified as being mutated in inherited neurodegenerative diseases. Thus, it appears that DNA transactions involving DNA ligase III-alpha play an important role in maintaining the viability of neuronal cells.

LIG3 has a role in microhomology-mediated end joining (MMEJ) repair of double strand breaks. It is one of 6 enzymes required for this error prone DNA repair pathway. LIG3 is upregulated in chronic myeloid leukemia, multiple myeloma, and breast cancer.

Cancers are very often deficient in expression of one or more DNA repair genes, but over-expression of a DNA repair gene is less usual in cancer. For instance, at least 36 DNA repair enzymes, when mutationally defective in germ line cells, cause increased risk of cancer (hereditary cancer syndromes). (Also see DNA repair-deficiency disorder.) Similarly, at least 12 DNA repair genes have frequently been found to be epigenetically repressed in one or more cancers. (See also Epigenetically reduced DNA repair and cancer.) Ordinarily, deficient expression of a DNA repair enzyme results in increased un-repaired DNA damages which, through replication errors (translesion synthesis), lead to mutations and cancer. However, LIG3 mediated MMEJ repair is highly inaccurate, so in this case, over-expression, rather than under-expression, apparently leads to cancer.
