= Posterior column ataxia-retinitis pigmentosa syndrome =

Genetic disorder

- Specialty: Ophthalmology

Posterior column ataxia-retinitis pigmentosa syndrome (PCARP) is an autosomal recessive genetic disorder of the human eye, attributed to mutation of a gene originally dubbed AXPC1 which was identified as a mutation in the FLCVR1 gene. Generally rare, a Pennsylvania Mennonite variant has been estimated to have a population allele prevalence close to 1% due to founder effects.

== Clinical phenotype ==
The syndrome was described having childhood-onset symptoms with sensory neuropathy characterized by proprioceptive loss with retinitis pigmentosa presenting with concentric visual field loss. By adulthood patients were blind with ataxia.
