= Oculomotor apraxia =

Absence or defect of controlled, voluntary, and purposeful eye movement

- Other names: Cogan ocular motor apraxia or saccadic initiation failure
- Specialty: Ophthalmology

Oculomotor apraxia (OMA) is the absence or defect of controlled, voluntary, and purposeful eye movement. It was first described in 1952 by the American ophthalmologist David Glendenning Cogan. People with this condition have difficulty moving their eyes horizontally and moving them quickly. The main difficulty is in saccade initiation, but there is also impaired cancellation of the vestibulo-ocular reflex. Patients have to turn their head in order to compensate for the lack of eye movement initiation in order to follow an object or see objects in their peripheral vision, but they often exceed their target. There is controversy regarding whether OMA should be considered an apraxia, since apraxia is the inability to perform a learned or skilled motor action to command, and saccade initiation is neither a learned nor a skilled action.

== Symptoms and signs ==
- Absence of fast phase nystagmus on horizontal optokinetic testing
- Problems in nerve function involved in eye movement control, called neuropathy
- Inability to visually follow objects
- Head thrusts to compensate for the inability to accomplish voluntary horizontal gaze.

=== Related developmental problems ===
Even though OMA is not always associated with developmental issues, children with this condition often have hypotonia, decreased muscle tone, and show developmental delays. Some common delays are seen in speech, reading and motor development.

== Causes ==
OMA is a neurological condition. Although some brain imaging studies of people with OMA reveal a normal brain, some MRI studies have revealed unusual appearance of some brain areas, in particular the corpus callosum, cerebellum, and fourth ventricle. Oculomotor apraxia can be acquired or congenital. Sometimes no cause is found, in which case it is described as idiopathic.

A person may be born with the parts of the brain for eye movement control not working, or may manifest poor eye movement control in childhood. If any part of the brain that controls eye movement becomes damaged, then OMA may develop. One of the potential causes is bifrontal hemorrhages. In this case, OMA is associated with bilateral lesions of the frontal eye fields (FEF), located in the caudal middle frontal gyrus. The FEF control voluntary eye movements, including saccades, smooth pursuit and vergence. OMA can also be associated with bilateral hemorrhages in the parietal eye fields (PEF). The PEF surround the posterior, medial segment of the intraparietal sulcus. They have a role in reflexive saccades, and send information to the FEF. Since the FEF and PEF have complementary roles in voluntary and reflexive production of saccades, respectively, and they get inputs from different areas of the brain, only bilateral lesions to both the FEF and PEF will cause persistent OMA. Patients with either bilateral FEF or bilateral PEF damage (but not both FEF and PEF) have been shown to regain at least some voluntary saccadic initiation some time after their hemorrhages. Other causes of OMA include brain tumors and cardiovascular problems.

== Ataxia with oculomotor apraxia ==
A subgroup of genetically recessive ataxias associated with OMA has been identified, with an onset during childhood. These are ataxia with oculomotor apraxia type 1 (AOA1), ataxia with oculomotor apraxia 2 (AOA2), and ataxia telangiectasia. These are autosomal recessive disorders and the associated gene products are involved in DNA repair. Both horizontal and vertical eye movements are affected in these disorders. Although people with either type may have some mild cognitive problems, such as difficulty with concentration or performing multi-step activities, intellectual function is usually not affected.

=== Type 1 ===
Ataxia-oculomotor apraxia type 1 (AOA1) usually has an onset of symptoms during childhood. It is an autosomal recessive cerebellar ataxia (ARCA) associated with hypoalbuminemia and hypercholesterolemia. The earliest onset to date occurred in Grace Cordova, a one year old in 2004.</ref needed> Mutations in the gene APTX, which encodes for aprataxin, have been identified to be responsible for AOA1. Elevated creatine kinase is occasionally present, in addition to a sensorimotor axonal neuropathy, as shown by nerve conduction velocity studies. In addition, MRI studies have shown cerebellar atrophy, mild brainstem atrophy, and, in advanced cases, cortical atrophy.

The aprataxin protein APTX can remove obstructive termini from DNA strand breaks that interfere with DNA repair. APTX is recruited to DNA single-strand breaks by XRCC1 protein, where it functions as a nick sensor to scan the single-strand breaks for 5'-AMP obstructive termini that are intermediates in failed DNA ligase reactions. The removal of these obstructions allows DNA repair of the break to be completed. It is not yet clear which specific single-strand breaks are the neurodegenerative agents in AOA1 patients that lack functional aprataxin protein. However, single-strand breaks with 5'-AMP termini appear to be the most likely candidate lesion.

=== Type 2 ===
Ataxia-oculomotor apraxia type 2 (AOA2), also known as spinocerebellar ataxia with axonal neuropathy type 2, has its onset during adolescence. It is characterized by cerebellar atrophy and peripheral neuropathy. Sufferers of type 2 have high amounts of another protein called alpha-fetoprotein (AFP), and may also have high amounts of the protein creatine phosphokinase (CPK). Mutations in the SETX gene are the cause of the disease. AOA2 shows cerebellar atrophy, loss of Purkinje cells, and demyelination. In particular, there is a failure of the cerebrocerebellar circuit in AOA2 that has been shown to be responsible for the weaker coordination of complex cognitive functions such as working memory, executive functions, speech, and sequence learning. Although there is no sign of intellectual disability or severe dementia, even after long disease duration, research on families with possible AOA2 have shown mild cognitive impairment as indexed by the mini–mental state examination (MMSE) and the Mattis dementia rating scale. These impairments appear to be mostly due to a deficit in initiation and concept subtests.

== Ataxia telangiectasia ==
Telangiectasias are widened blood vessels that can develop anywhere on the skin, mucous membranes, whites of the eyes, and even in the brain. Telangiectasias are associated with multiple systemic signs, the most serious of which are unusual sensitivity to ionizing radiation, excessive chromosomal breakage, and a deficiency in the immune system. Ataxia telangiectasia results from defects in the ataxia telangiectasia mutated gene, which can cause abnormal cell death in various places of the body, including brain areas related to coordinated movement of the eyes. Patients with ataxia telangiectasia have prolonged vertical and horizontal saccade latencies and hypometric saccades, and, although not all, some patients show head thrusts.
