= Autosomal recessive cerebellar ataxia type 1 =

Hereditary ataxia that has material basis in autosomal recessive inheritance

- Other names: Autosomal recessive ataxia Beauce type
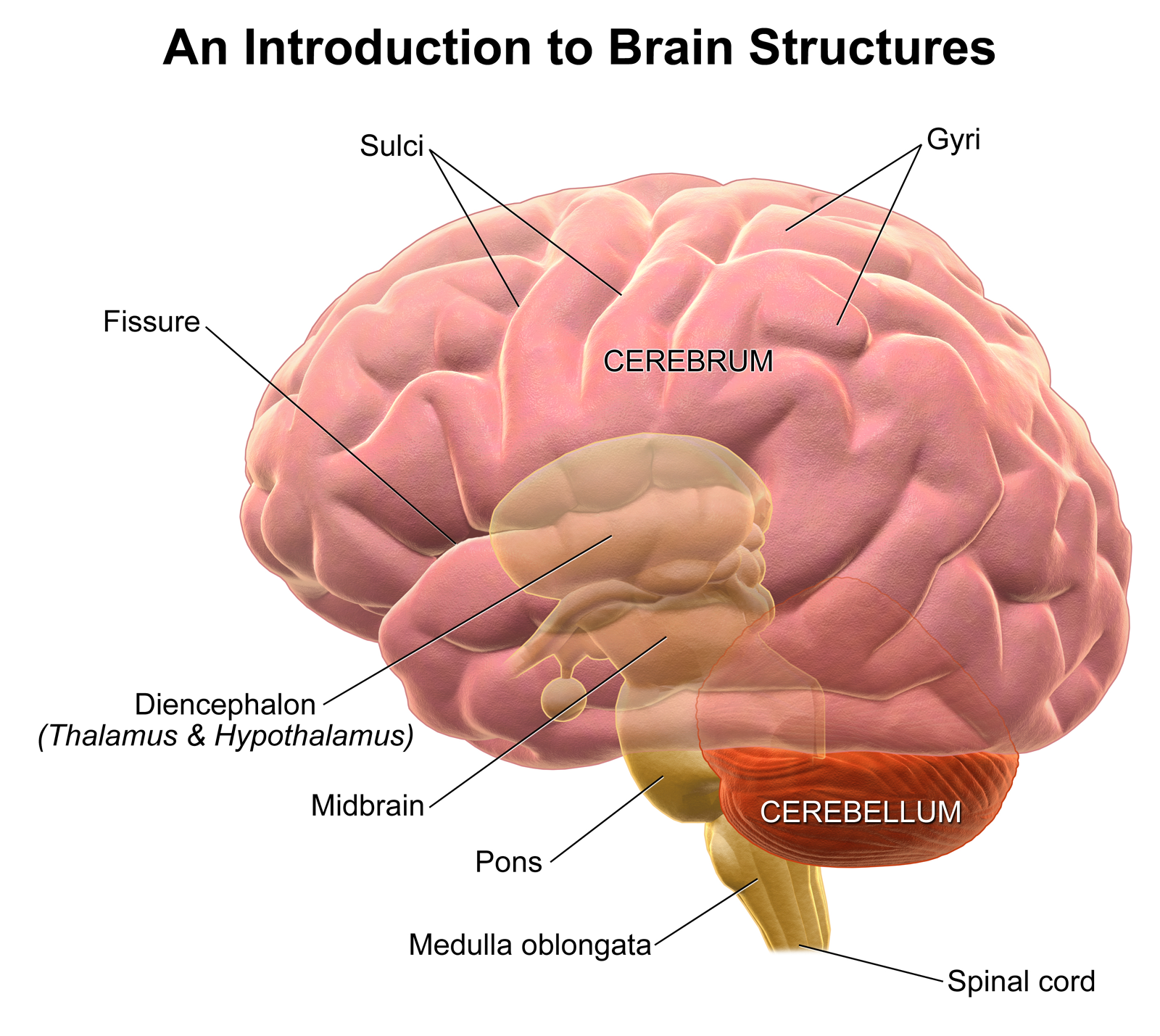
- This condition affects the cerebellum(lower back area of brain)
- Specialty: Neurology

Autosomal recessive cerebellar ataxia type 1 (ARCA1) is a condition characterized by progressive problems with movement. Signs and symptoms of the disorder first appear in early to mid-adulthood. People with this condition initially experience impaired speech (dysarthria), problems with coordination and balance (ataxia), or both. They may also have difficulty with movements that involve judging distance or scale (dysmetria). Other features of ARCA1 include abnormal eye movements (nystagmus) and problems following the movements of objects with their eyes. The movement problems are slowly progressive, often resulting in the need for a cane, walker, or wheelchair.

== Presentation ==
Most cases of autosomal recessive cerebellar ataxia are early onset, usually around the age of 20. People with this type of ataxia share many characteristic symptoms including:

- frequent falls due to poor balance
- imprecise hand coordination
- postural or kinetic tremor of extremities or trunk
- dysarthria
- dysphasia
- vertigo
- diplopia
- lower extremity tendon reflexes
- dysmetria
- minor abnormalities in ocular saccades
- attention defects
- impaired verbal working memory and visuospatial skills
- Normal life expectancy

Autosomal recessive ataxias are generally associated with a loss of proprioception and vibration sense. Arreflexia is more common in autosomal recessive ataxia than autosomal dominant ataxias. Also, they tend to have more involvement outside of the nervous system. Mutations in subunit of the mitochondrial DNA polymerase (POLG) have been found to be a potential cause of autosomal recessive cerebellar ataxia.

== Cause ==
ARCA1 is caused by the mutated SYNE1 gene that is vital for the synthesis of Syne-1 protein in the Purkinje cells of the cerebellum. Deformed Syne-1 protein disrupts normal Purkinje cell functions and impairs its signalling with cerebellar neurons. To date it is still unclear how the impaired syne-1 proteins leads to the loss of cells in the cerebellum that contribute to ARCA1.

== Genetics ==
Ataxia with telangiectasia is a rare form ataxia that causes chromosomal instability, sensitivity to ionizing radiation, disrupted stress-activated signal transduction pathways and radioresistant DNA synthesis.

The genes that underlie majority of the symptoms for the different types of ataxia are still unknown. A productive cure is still unavailable to prevent the brain degeneration associated with ataxia.

Oculomotor ataxia accompanies gait ataxia which causes dysarthria, muscle weakness, loss of joint position sense and limb dysmetria. In some cases, patients have shown mental retardation and loss of myelinated axons.

== Diagnosis ==
Clinical diagnosis is conducted on individuals with age onset between late teens and late forties who show the initial characteristics for the recessive autosomal cerebellar ataxia. The following tests are performed:

- MRI brain screening for cerebellum atrophy.
- Molecular genetic testing for SYNE-1 sequence analysis.
- Electrophysiologic studies for polyneuropathy
- Neurological examination

Prenatal diagnosis and preimplantation genetic diagnosis (PGD) can be performed to identify the mothers carrying the recessive genes for cerebellar ataxia.

=== Types ===
The classification of autosomal recessive ataxias takes into consideration the phenotypes

There are different types of ataxias:

- congenital ataxias (developmental disorders)
- ataxias with metabolic disorders
- ataxias with a DNA repair defect
- degenerative ataxias
- ataxia associated with other features.

== Treatments ==
- Occupational and physical therapy is available for gait dysfunction.
- Abetalipoproteinemia treatment is received for its potential in preventing vitamin E deficiency. (1000 mg/day for infants and over 5,000 mg/day for adults.)
- Co Q10 supplementation (300 to 600 mg/day) for coenzyme Q10 deficiency.

== Prognosis ==
In most cases, between the age of 2 and 4 oculomotor signals are present. Between the age of 2 and 8, telangiectasias appears. Usually by the age of 10 the child needs a wheel chair. Individuals with autosomal recessive cerebellum ataxia usually survive until their 20s; in some cases individuals have survived until their 40s or 50s.
