= Ataxia–telangiectasia =

Rare neurodegenerative disease

Ataxia–telangiectasia (AT or A–T), also referred to as ataxia–telangiectasia syndrome or Louis-Bar syndrome, is a rare, neurodegenerative disease causing severe disability. Ataxia refers to poor coordination and telangiectasia to small dilated blood vessels, both of which are hallmarks of the disease. A–T affects many parts of the body:

- It impairs certain areas of the brain including the cerebellum, causing difficulty with movement and coordination.
- It weakens the immune system, causing a predisposition to infection.
- It prevents the repair of broken DNA, increasing the risk of cancer.

Symptoms most often first appear in early childhood (the toddler stage) when children begin to sit or walk. Though they usually start walking at a normal age, they wobble or sway when walking, standing still, or sitting. In late preschool and early school age, they develop difficulty naturally moving their eyes from one place to the next (oculomotor apraxia). They develop slurred or distorted speech and swallowing problems. Some have an increased number of respiratory tract infections (ear infections, sinusitis, bronchitis, and pneumonia). Since children develop differently, it may be some years before A–T is properly diagnosed. Most children with A–T have stable neurologic symptoms for the first 4–5 years of life, but begin to show increasing problems in early school years.

== Causes ==
A–T has an autosomal recessive pattern of inheritance.

A–T is caused by a defect in the ATM gene, named after this disease, which is involved in the recognition and repair of damaged DNA. Heterozygotes will not experience the characteristic symptoms, but it has been reported that they have higher risks of cancer and heart disease. The prevalence of A–T is estimated to be as high as 1 in 40,000 to as low as 1 in 300,000 people.

== Signs and symptoms ==
There is substantial variability in the severity of the signs and symptoms of A–T among affected individuals, and they may appear at different ages. The following symptoms or problems are either common or important features of A–T:

- Ataxia (difficulty with control of movement) that is apparent early but worsens in school to pre-teen years
- Oculomotor apraxia (difficulty with coordination of head and eye movement when shifting gaze from one place to the next)
- Involuntary (extrapyramidal) movements
- Telangiectasia (dilated blood vessels) over the white (sclera) of the eyes, making them appear bloodshot. These are not apparent in infancy and may first appear between the ages of 5–8 years. Telangiectasia may also appear on sun-exposed areas of skin.
- Problems with infections, especially of the ears, sinuses, and lungs
- Increased incidence of cancer (primarily, but not exclusively, lymphomas and leukemias)
- Delayed onset or incomplete pubertal development, and very early menopause
- Slowed rate of growth (weight and/or height)
- Drooling, particularly in young children, when they are tired or concentrating on activities
- Dysarthria (slurred, slow, or distorted speech)
- Diabetes in adolescence or later on in disease progression
- Premature changes in hair and skin

Many children are initially misdiagnosed as having cerebral palsy. The diagnosis of A–T may not be made until the preschool years when the neurologic symptoms of impaired gait, hand coordination, speech, and eye movement appear or worsen, and the telangiectasia first develops. Because A–T is so rare, doctors may not be familiar with the symptoms or methods of making a diagnosis. The late appearance of telangiectasia may be a barrier to the diagnosis. It may also take some time before doctors consider A–T as a possibility because of the early stability of symptoms and signs. Some patients have been diagnosed with A-T only in adulthood due to an attenuated form of the disease, and this has been correlated with the type of their gene mutation.

=== Ataxia and other neurologic problems ===
The first indications of A–T usually occur during the toddler years. Children start walking at a normal age, but may not improve much from their initial wobbly gait. Sometimes they have problems standing or sitting still and tend to sway backward or from side to side. During the primary school years, walking becomes more difficult, and children will use doorways and walls for support. Children with A–T often appear better when running or walking quickly in comparison to when they walk slowly or stand still. Around the beginning of their second decade, children with the more severe ("classic") form of A–T start using a wheelchair for long distances. During school years, children may have increasing difficulty with reading because of impaired coordination of eye movement. At the same time, other problems with fine motor functions (writing, coloring, and using utensils to eat) and with speech (dysarthria) may arise. Most of these neurologic problems stop progressing after the age of about 12 – 15 years, though involuntary movements may start at any age and may worsen over time. These extra movements can take many forms, including small jerks of the hands and feet that look like fidgeting (chorea), slower twisting movements of the upper body (athetosis), adoption of stiff and twisted postures (dystonia), occasional uncontrolled jerks (myoclonic jerks), and various rhythmic and non-rhythmic movements with attempts at coordinated action (tremors).

=== Telangiectasia ===
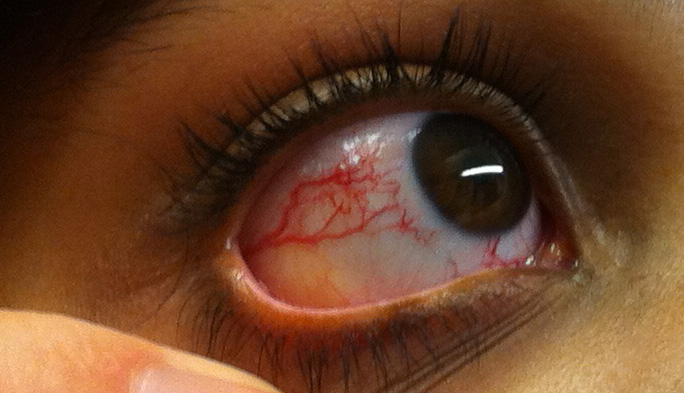
Ocular telangiectasia in a person with A–T

Prominent blood vessels (telangiectasia) over the white (sclera) of the eyes usually occur by the age of 5–8 years, but sometimes appear later or not at all. The absence of telangiectasia does not exclude the diagnosis of A–T. Potentially a cosmetic problem, the ocular telangiectasia does not bleed or itch, though they are sometimes misdiagnosed as chronic conjunctivitis. It is their constant nature, not changing with time, weather, or emotion, that marks them as different from other visible blood vessels. Telangiectasia can also appear on sun-exposed areas of skin, especially the face and ears. They occur in the bladder as a late complication of chemotherapy with cyclophosphamide, have been seen deep inside the brain of older people with A–T, and occasionally arise in the liver and lungs.

=== Immune problems ===
About two-thirds of people with A–T have abnormalities of the immune system. The most common abnormalities are low levels of one or more classes of immunoglobulins (IgA, IgM, and IgG subclasses), not making antibodies in response to vaccines or infections, and having low numbers of lymphocytes (especially T-lymphocytes) in the blood. Some people develop frequent infections of the upper (common colds, sinus, and ear infections) and lower (bronchitis and pneumonia) respiratory tract. All children with A–T should have their immune systems evaluated to detect those with severe problems that require treatment to minimize the number or severity of infections. Some people with A–T need additional immunizations (especially with pneumonia and influenza vaccines), antibiotics to provide protection (prophylaxis) from infections, and/or infusions of immunoglobulins (gamma globulin). An expert in the field of immunodeficiency or infectious diseases should determine the need for these treatments.

=== Cancer ===
People with A–T have a highly increased incidence (approximately 25% lifetime risk) of cancers, particularly lymphomas and leukemia, but other cancers can occur.

Women who are A–T carriers (who have one mutated copy of the ATM gene) have approximately a two-fold increased risk for the development of breast cancer compared to the general population. This includes all mothers of A–T children and some female relatives. The current consensus is that enhanced screening consisting of annual mammographies and frequently, an annual breast MRI should be used for patients carrying ATM mutations.

=== Skin ===
A–T can cause features of early aging, such as premature graying of the hair. It can also cause vitiligo (an autoimmune disease causing loss of skin pigment resulting in a blotchy "bleach-splashed" look), and warts, which can be extensive and recalcitrant to treatment. A small number of people develop a chronic inflammatory skin disease (granulomas).

=== Lung disease ===
Chronic lung disease develops in more than 25% of people with A–T.

Lung function tests (spirometry) should be performed at least annually in children old enough to participate, influenza and pneumococcal vaccines given to eligible individuals, and sinopulmonary infections treated aggressively to limit the development of chronic lung disease.

=== Feeding, swallowing, and nutrition ===
Feeding and swallowing can become difficult for people with A–T as they age.

Involuntary movements may make feeding difficult or messy and may excessively prolong mealtimes. It may be easier to finger feed than use utensils (e.g., spoon or fork). For liquids, it is often easier to drink from a closed container with a straw than from an open cup. Caregivers may need to provide foods or liquids so that self-feeding can occur, or they may need to hand-feed the person with A–T. In general, meals should be completed within approximately 30 minutes. Longer meals may be stressful, interfere with other daily activities, and limit the intake of necessary liquids and nutrients.

If swallowing problems (dysphagia) occur, they typically present during the second decade of life. Difficulty swallowing is common because of the neurological changes that interfere with the coordination of mouth and pharynx (throat) movements that are needed for safe and efficient swallowing. Coordination problems involving the mouth may make chewing difficult and increase the meal duration. Problems involving the pharynx may cause liquid, food, and saliva to be inhaled into the airway (aspiration). People with dysphagia may not cough when they aspirate (silent aspiration). Swallowing problems, especially difficulties with silent aspiration, can lead to lung diseases due to the inability to cough and clear food and liquids from the airway.

Warning signs of a swallowing problem

- Choking or coughing when eating or drinking
- Poor weight gain (during ages of expected growth) or weight loss at any age
- Excessive drooling
- Mealtimes longer than 40–45 minutes, regularly
- Foods or drinks previously enjoyed are now refused or difficult to consume
- Chewing problems
- Increase in the frequency or duration of breathing or respiratory problems
- Increase in lung infections

=== Eye and vision ===
- Most people develop telangiectasia (prominent blood vessels) in the membrane that covers the white part (sclera) of the eye.
- Vision (ability to see objects in focus) is normal.
- Control of eye movement is often impaired, affecting visual functions that require fast, accurate eye movements from point to point (e.g., reading).
- Eye misalignments (strabismus) are common but may be treatable.
- There may be difficulty in coordinating eye position and shaping the lens to see objects up close.

=== Orthopedics ===
Many individuals with A–T develop foot deformities that compound the difficulty they have with walking due to impaired coordination. Early treatment may slow the progression of this deformity. Bracing or surgical correction may improve ankle stability, thereby allowing the individual to walk with support or bear weight during assisted standing transfers from one seat to another. Severe scoliosis is relatively uncommon, but probably does occur more often than in those without A–T. Spinal fusion is only rarely indicated.

== Genetics ==
A–T is inherited in an autosomal recessive fashion.

A–T is caused by mutations in the ATM (ATM serine/threonine kinase or ataxia–telangiectasia mutated) gene, which was cloned in 1995. ATM is located on human chromosome 11 (11q22.3) and is made up of 69 exons spread across 150kb of genomic DNA.

The mode of inheritance for A–T is autosomal recessive. Each parent is a carrier, meaning that they have one normal copy of the A–T gene (ATM) and one mutated copy. A–T occurs if a child inherits the mutated A–T gene from each parent, so in a family with two carrier parents, there is 1 chance in 4 that a child born to the parents will have the disorder. Prenatal diagnosis (and carrier detection) can be carried out in families if the errors (mutation) in an affected child's two ATM genes have been identified. The process of getting this done can be complicated and, as it requires time, should be arranged before conception.

Looking for mutations in the ATM gene of an unrelated person (for example, the spouse of a known A–T carrier) presents significant challenges. Genes often have variant spellings (polymorphisms) that do not affect function. In a gene as large as ATM, such variant spellings are likely to occur, and doctors cannot always predict whether a specific variant will cause disease. Genetic counseling can help family members of an A–T patient understand what can or cannot be tested, and how the test results should be interpreted.

Carriers of A–T, such as the parents of a person with A–T, have one mutated copy of the ATM gene and one normal copy. They are generally healthy, but there is an increased risk of breast cancer in women. This finding has been confirmed in various ways and is the subject of current research. Standard surveillance (including monthly breast self-exams and mammography at the usual schedule for age) is recommended, unless additional tests are indicated because the individual has other risk factors (e.g., family history of breast cancer).

Non-canonical variants such as the insertion of a retrotransposon, which had not been studied until a few years ago, actually appear to have therapeutic implications in the development of Ataxia-telangiectasia. A recent study investigated this issue using NGS sequencing techniques and in vitro studies in a cohort of 235 AT patients from the Boston Children's Hospital. The study demonstrated that insertions of retroelements in the ATM gene are the cause of the disease in 5.5% of patients and that insertions occur in non-coding regions in 92.3% of cases.

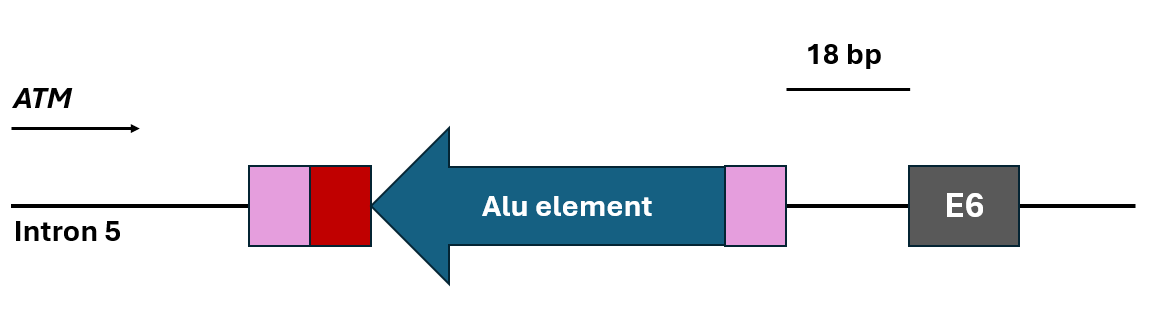
Insertion of an Alu element in ATM in an AT patient in intron 5, only 18 bp away from exon 6

This happens because insertions of retroelements, especially Alu elements, near an exon-intron boundary cause changes in the splicing sites, resulting in the exclusion of an exon from the mature mRNA. This leads to premature stop codons, which cause the degradation and loss of function of ATM. In addition, the insertion of the DUSP16 pseudogene into ATM can also result in loss of ATM function, as it leads to the appearance of a cryptic exon in mRNA due to the formation of new splicing acceptor and donor sites. This, again, generates premature stop codons.

== Pathophysiology ==
How loss of the ATM protein creates a multisystem disorder

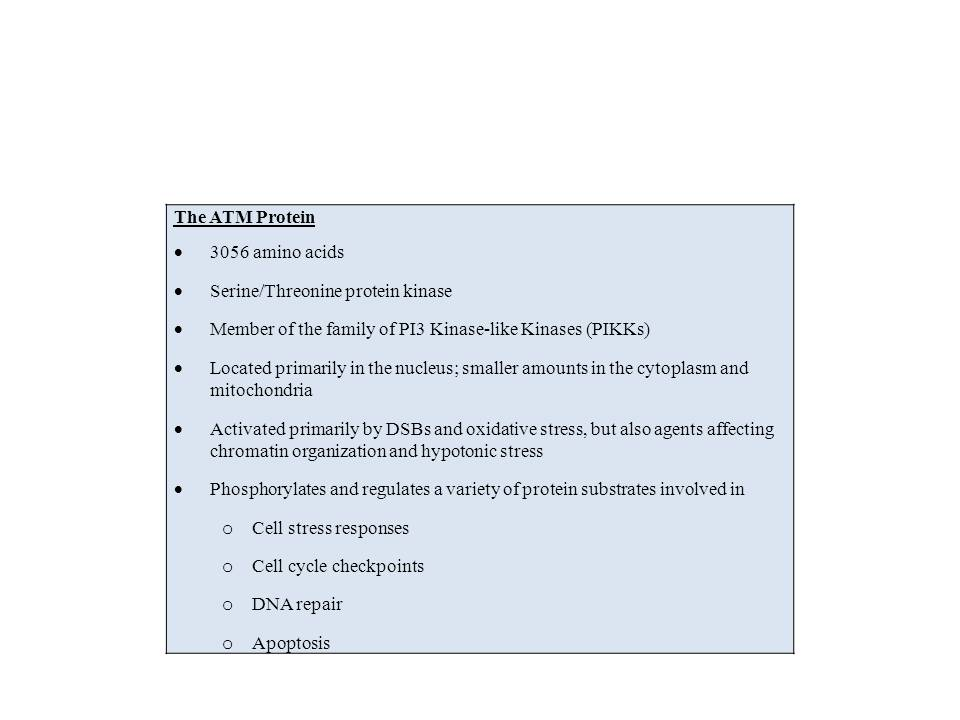
Characteristics of the ATM protein

A–T has been described as a genome instability syndrome, a DNA repair disorder, and a DNA damage response (DDR) syndrome. ATM, the gene responsible for this multi-system disorder, encodes a protein of the same name which coordinates the cellular response to DNA double-strand breaks (DSBs). Radiation therapy, chemotherapy that acts like radiation (radiomimetic drugs), and certain biochemical processes and metabolites can cause DSBs. When these breaks occur, ATM stops the cell from making new DNA (cell cycle arrest) and recruits and activates other proteins to repair the damage. Thus, ATM allows the cell to repair its DNA before the completion of cell division. If DNA damage is too severe, ATM will mediate the process of programmed cell death (apoptosis) to eliminate the cell and prevent genomic instability.

=== Cancer and radiosensitivity ===
In the absence of the ATM protein, cell-cycle checkpoint regulation and programmed cell death in response to DSBs are defective. The result is genomic instability, which can lead to the development of cancers.

Ionizing radiation (such as X-rays and gamma rays) and radiomimetic compounds induce DSBs, which cannot be repaired appropriately when ATM is absent. Consequently, such agents can prove especially cytotoxic to A–T cells and people with A–T. Therefore, X-ray exposure should be limited to times when it is medically necessary, as exposing an A–T patient to ionizing radiation can damage cells in such a way that the body cannot repair them. The cells can cope normally with other forms of radiation, such as ultraviolet light, so there is no need for special precautions from sunlight exposure.

=== Delayed pubertal development (gonadal dysgenesis) ===
Infertility is often described as a characteristic of A–T. Whereas this is certainly the case for the mouse model of A–T, in humans it may be more accurate to characterize the reproductive abnormality as gonadal atrophy or dysgenesis characterized by delayed pubertal development. Because programmed DSBs are generated to initiate genetic recombinations involved in the production of sperm and eggs in reproductive organs (a process known as meiosis), meiotic defects and arrest can occur when ATM is not present.

=== Immune system defects and immune-related cancers ===
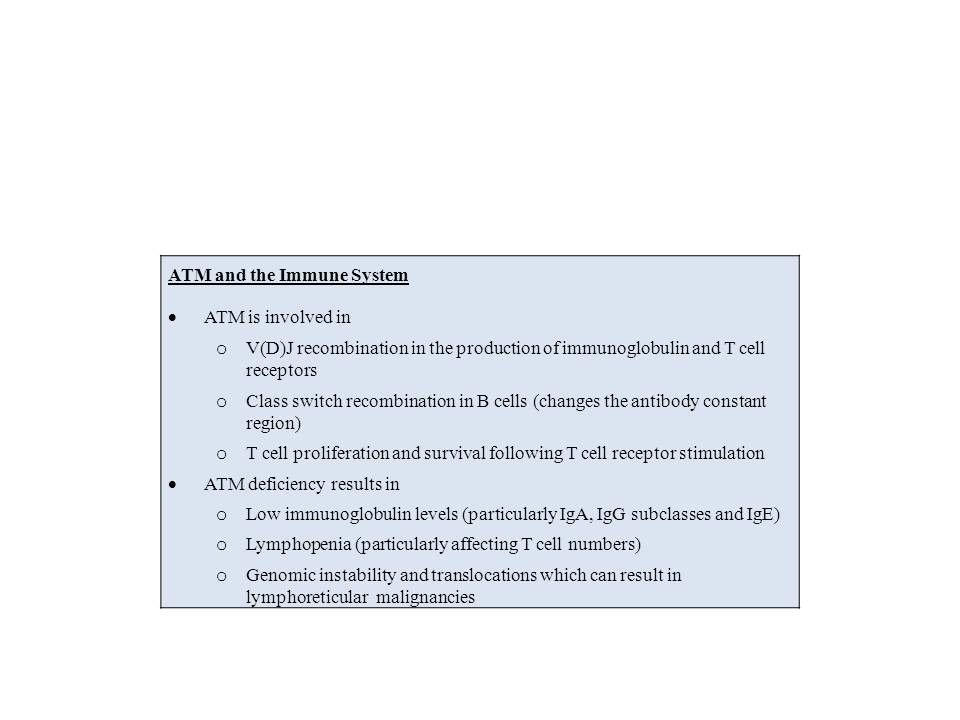
ATM and the immune system

As lymphocytes develop from stem cells in the bone marrow into mature lymphocytes in the periphery, they rearrange special segments of their DNA [V(D)J recombination process]. This process requires them to make DSBs, which are difficult to repair in the absence of ATM. As a result, most people with A–T have reduced numbers of lymphocytes and some impairment of lymphocyte function (such as an impaired ability to make antibodies in response to vaccines or infections). In addition, broken pieces of DNA in chromosomes involved in the aforementioned rearrangements tend to recombine with other genes (translocation), making the cells prone to the development of cancer (lymphoma and leukemia).

=== Progeric changes ===
Cells from patients with A–T exhibit genomic instability, slow growth, and premature senescence in culture, shortened telomeres, and an ongoing, low-level stress response. These factors may contribute to the progeric (signs of early aging) changes of skin and hair sometimes observed in people with A–T. For example, DNA damage and genomic instability cause melanocyte stem cell (MSC) differentiation, which produces graying. Thus, ATM may be a "stemness checkpoint" protecting against MSC differentiation and premature graying of the hair.

=== Telangiectasia ===
The cause of telangiectasia or dilated blood vessels in the absence of the ATM protein is not yet known.

=== Increased alpha-fetoprotein (AFP) levels ===
Approximately 95% of people with A–T have elevated serum AFP levels after the age of two, and measured levels of AFP appear to increase slowly over time. AFP levels are very high in the newborn, and normally descend to adult levels over the first year to 18 months. The reason why individuals with A–T have elevated levels of AFP is not yet known.

=== Neurodegeneration ===
A–T is one of several DNA repair disorders that result in neurological abnormalities or degeneration. Arguably, some of the most devastating symptoms of A–T are a result of progressive cerebellar degeneration, characterized by the loss of Purkinje cells and, to a lesser extent, granule cells (located exclusively in the cerebellum). The cause of this cell loss is unknown, though many hypotheses have been proposed based on experiments performed both in cell culture and in the mouse model of A–T. Current hypotheses explaining the neurodegeneration associated with A–T include the following:

- Defective DNA damage response in neurons which can lead to
  - Failed clearance of genomically damaged neurons during development
  - Transcription stress and abortive transcription including topoisomerase 1 cleavage complex (TOP1cc) dependent lesions
  - Aneuploidy
- Defective response to oxidative stress characterized by elevated ROS and altered cellular metabolism
- Mitochondrial dysfunction
- Defects in neuronal function:
  - Inappropriate cell cycle re-entry of post-mitotic (mature) neurons
  - Synaptic/vesicular dysregulation
  - HDAC4 dysregulation
  - Histone hypermethylation and altered epigenetics
- Altered protein turnover

These hypotheses may not be mutually exclusive, and more than one of these mechanisms may underlie neuronal cell death when there is an absence or deficiency of ATM. Furthermore, cerebellar damage and loss of Purkinje and granule cells do not explain all of the neurologic abnormalities seen in people with A–T. The effects of ATM deficiency on the other areas of the brain outside of the cerebellum are being actively investigated.

== Diagnosis ==
The diagnosis of A–T is usually suspected by the combination of neurologic clinical features (ataxia, abnormal control of eye movement, and postural instability) with telangiectasia and sometimes increased infections, and confirmed by specific laboratory abnormalities (elevated alpha-fetoprotein levels, increased chromosomal breakage or cell death of white blood cells after exposure to X-rays, absence of ATM protein in white blood cells, or mutations in each of the person's ATM genes).

A variety of laboratory abnormalities occur in most people with A–T, allowing for a tentative diagnosis to be made in the presence of typical clinical features. Not all abnormalities are seen in all patients. These abnormalities include:

- Elevated and slowly increasing alpha-fetoprotein levels in serum after 2 years of age
- Immunodeficiency with low levels of immunoglobulins (especially IgA, IgM, IgG, and IgG subclasses) and a low number of lymphocytes in the blood
- Chromosomal instability (broken pieces of chromosomes)
- Increased sensitivity of cells to x-ray exposure (cells die or develop even more breaks and other damage to chromosomes)
- Cerebellar atrophy on MRI scan

The diagnosis can be confirmed in the laboratory by finding an absence or deficiency of the ATM protein in cultured blood cells, an absence or deficiency of ATM function (kinase assay), or mutations in both copies of the cell's ATM gene. These more specialized tests are not always needed, but are particularly helpful if a child's symptoms are atypical.

=== Differential diagnosis ===
There are several other disorders with similar symptoms or laboratory features that physicians may consider when diagnosing A–T. The three most common disorders that are sometimes confused with A–T are:

- Cerebral palsy
- Friedreich's ataxia
- Cogan oculomotor apraxia

Each of these can be distinguished from A–T by the neurologic exam and clinical history.

Cerebral palsy (CP) describes a non-progressive disorder of motor function stemming from malformation or early damage to the brain. CP can manifest in many ways, given the different manner in which the brain can be damaged; in common to all forms is the emergence of signs and symptoms of impairment as the child develops. However, milestones that have been accomplished and neurologic functions that have developed do not deteriorate in CP as they often do in children with A–T in the late pre-school years. Most children with ataxia caused by CP do not begin to walk at a normal age, whereas most children with A–T start to walk at a normal age, even though they often "wobble" from the start. Pure ataxia is a rare manifestation of early brain damage or malformation; however, the possibility of an occult genetic disorder of the brain should be considered and sought for those in whom ataxia is the chief manifestation of CP. Children with ataxic CP will not manifest the laboratory abnormalities associated with A–T.

Cogan oculomotor apraxia is a rare developmental disorder. Affected children have difficulty moving their eyes only to a new visual target, so they will turn their heads past the target to "drag" their eyes to the new object of interest, then turn their heads back. This tendency becomes evident in late infancy and toddler years and mostly improves with time. This contrasts with the oculomotor difficulties evident in children with A–T, which are not evident in early childhood but emerge over time. Cogan's oculomotor apraxia is generally an isolated problem or may be associated with a broader developmental delay.

Friedreich ataxia (FA) is the most common genetic cause of ataxia in children. Like A–T, FA is a recessive disease. It often appears in families without a history of the disorder. A mutation in the frataxin gene causes FA, most often an expansion of a naturally occurring repetition of the three-nucleotide bases GAA from the usual 5–33 repetitions of this trinucleotide sequence to greater than 65 repeats on each chromosome. Most often, the ataxia appears between 10 and 15 years of age and differs from A–T by the absence of telangiectasia and oculomotor apraxia, a normal alpha fetoprotein, and the frequent presence of scoliosis, absent tendon reflexes, and abnormal features on the EKG. Individuals with FA manifest difficulty standing in one place, which is much enhanced by the closure of the eyes (Romberg sign) that is not so apparent in those with A–T, even though those with A–T may have greater difficulty standing in one place with their eyes open.

Other rare disorders can be confused with A–T due to similar clinical features, similar laboratory features, or both. These include:

- Ataxia–oculomotor apraxia type 1 (AOA1)
- Ataxia–oculomotor apraxia type 2 (AOA2 also known as SCAR1)
- Ataxia–telangiectasia–like disorder (ATLD)
- Nijmegen breakage syndrome (NBS)

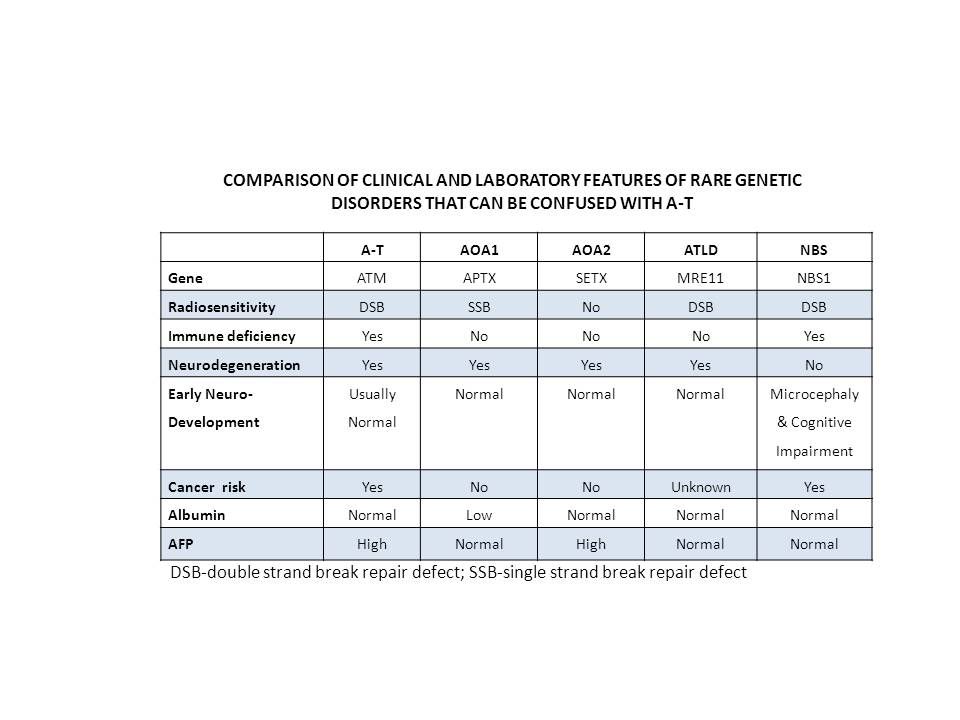
Comparison of clinical and laboratory features of rare genetic disorders than can be confused with A–T

Ataxia–oculomotor apraxia type 1 (AOA1) is an autosomal recessive disorder similar to A–T in manifesting increasing problems with coordination and oculomotor apraxia, often at a similar age to those having A–T. A mutation in the gene coding for the protein aprataxin causes the condition. Affected individuals differ from those with A–T by the early appearance of peripheral neuropathy, early in their course, manifest difficulty with the initiation of gaze shifts, and the absence of ocular telangiectasia. Laboratory features are of key importance in differentiating the two conditions. Individuals with AOA1 have normal AFP, normal measures of immune function, and, after 10–15 years, low serum albumin levels. Genetic testing of the aprataxin gene can confirm the diagnosis. There is no enhanced risk for cancer.

Ataxia–oculomotor apraxia type 2 (AOA2) is an autosomal recessive disorder also similar to A–T in manifesting increasing problems with coordination and peripheral neuropathy, but oculomotor apraxia is present in only half of the affected individuals. Ocular telangiectasia does not develop. Laboratory abnormalities of AOA2 are like A–T, and unlike AOA1, have an elevated serum AFP level, but like AOA1 and unlike A–T in having normal markers of immune function. Genetic testing of the senataxin gene (SETX) can confirm the diagnosis. There is no enhanced risk for cancer.

Ataxia–telangiectasia-like disorder (ATLD) is an extremely rare condition, caused by a mutation in the hMre11 gene, that could be considered in the differential diagnosis of A–T. Patients with ATLD are very similar to those with A–T in showing progressive cerebellar ataxia, hypersensitivity to ionizing radiation, and genomic instability. Those rare individuals with ATLD who are well described differ from those with A–T by the absence of telangiectasia, normal immunoglobulin levels, a later onset, and a slower progression of the symptoms. Because of its rarity, it is not yet known whether or not ATLD carries an increased risk of developing cancer. Because those mutations of Mre11 that severely impair the MRE11 protein are incompatible with life, individuals with ATLD all have some partial function of the Mre11 protein, and hence likely all have their own levels of disease severity.

Nijmegen breakage syndrome (NBS) is a rare genetic disorder that has similar chromosomal instability to that seen in people with A–T, but the problems experienced are quite different. Children with NBS have significant microcephaly, a distinct facial appearance, short stature, and moderate cognitive impairment, but do not experience any neurologic deterioration over time. Like those with A–T, children with NBS have enhanced sensitivity to radiation, disposition to lymphoma and leukemia, and some laboratory measures of impaired immune function, but do not have ocular telangiectasia or an elevated level of AFP.

The proteins expressed by the hMre11 (defective in ATLD) and Nbs1 (defective in NBS) genes exist in the cell as a complex, along with a third protein expressed by the hRad50 gene. This complex, known as the MRN complex, plays an important role in DNA damage repair and signaling and is required to recruit ATM to the sites of DNA double-strand breaks. Mre11 and Nbs1 are also targets for phosphorylation by the ATM kinase. Thus, the similarity of the three diseases can be explained in part by the fact that the protein products of the three genes mutated in these disorders interact in common pathways in the cell.

Differentiation of these disorders is often possible with clinical features and selected laboratory tests. In cases where the distinction is unclear, clinical laboratories can identify genetic abnormalities of ATM, aprataxin, and senataxin, and specialty centers can identify abnormalities of the proteins of potentially responsible genes, such as ATM, MRE11, nibrin, TDP1, aprataxin, and senataxin, as well as other proteins important to ATM function, such as ATR, DNA-PK, and RAD50.

== Management ==
=== Ataxia and other neurologic problems ===
There is no treatment known to slow or stop the progression of the neurologic problems.

=== Immune problems ===
All individuals with A–T should have at least one comprehensive immunologic evaluation that measures the number and type of lymphocytes in the blood (T-lymphocytes and B-lymphocytes), the levels of serum immunoglobulins (IgG, IgA, and IgM), and antibody responses to T-dependent (e.g., tetanus, Hemophilus influenzae b) and T-independent (23-valent pneumococcal polysaccharide) vaccines. For the most part, the pattern of immunodeficiency seen in an A–T patient early in life (by age five) will be the same pattern seen throughout the lifetime of that individual. Therefore, the tests need not be repeated unless that individual develops more problems with infection. Problems with immunity can sometimes be overcome by immunization. Vaccines against common bacterial respiratory pathogens such as Haemophilus influenzae, pneumococci, and influenza virus (the "flu") are commercially available and often help to boost antibody responses, even in individuals with low immunoglobulin levels. If the vaccines do not work and the patient continues to have problems with infections, gamma globulin therapy (IV or subcutaneous infusions of antibodies collected from normal individuals) may be of benefit. A small number of people with A–T develop an abnormality in which one or more types of immunoglobulin are increased far beyond the normal range. In a few cases, the immunoglobulin levels can increase so much that the blood becomes thick and does not flow properly. Therapy for this problem must be tailored to the specific abnormality found and its severity.

If an individual patient's susceptibility to infection increases, it is crucial to reassess immune function in case deterioration has occurred and a new therapy is indicated. If infections are occurring in the lungs, it is also important to investigate the possibility of dysfunctional swallowing with aspiration into the lungs (see above sections under Symptoms: Lung Disease and Symptoms: Feeding, Swallowing and Nutrition.)

Most people with A–T have low lymphocyte counts in the blood. This problem seems to be relatively stable with age, but a rare number of people do have progressively decreasing lymphocyte counts as they get older. In the general population, very low lymphocyte counts are associated with an increased risk for infection. Such individuals develop complications from live viral vaccines (measles, mumps, rubella, and chickenpox), chronic or severe viral infections, yeast infections of the skin and vagina, and opportunistic infections (such as pneumocystis pneumonia). Although lymphocyte counts are often as low in people with A–T, they seldom have problems with opportunistic infections. (The one exception to that rule is that problems with chronic or recurrent warts are common.) The number and function of T-lymphocytes should be re-evaluated if a person with A–T is treated with corticosteroid drugs such as prednisone for longer than a few weeks or is treated with chemotherapy for cancer. If lymphocyte counts are low in people taking those types of drugs, the use of prophylactic antibiotics is recommended to prevent opportunistic infections.

If the tests show significant abnormalities of the immune system, a specialist in immunodeficiency or infectious diseases will be able to discuss various treatment options. The absence of immunoglobulin or antibody responses to the vaccine can be treated with replacement gamma globulin infusions or can be managed with prophylactic antibiotics and minimized exposure to infection. If antibody function is normal, all routine childhood immunizations, including live viral vaccines (measles, mumps, rubella, and varicella), should be given. In addition, several "special" vaccines (that is, licensed but not routine for otherwise healthy children and young adults) should be administered to decrease the risk that an A–T patient will develop lung infections. The patient and all household members should receive the influenza (flu) vaccine every fall. People with A–T who are less than two years old should receive three doses of a pneumococcal conjugate vaccine (Prevnar) given at two-month intervals. People older than two years who have not previously been immunized with Prevnar should receive two doses of Prevnar. At least 6 months after the last Prevnar has been given and after the child is at least two years old, the 23-valent pneumococcal vaccine should be administered. Immunization with the 23-valent pneumococcal vaccine should be repeated approximately every five years after the first dose.

In people with A–T who have low levels of IgA, further testing should be performed to determine whether the IgA level is low or completely absent. If absent, there is a slightly increased risk of a transfusion reaction. "Medical Alert" bracelets are not necessary. The family and primary physician should be aware that if there is elective surgery requiring red cell transfusion, the cells should be washed to decrease the risk of an allergic reaction.

People with A–T also have an increased risk of developing autoimmune or chronic inflammatory diseases. This risk is likely a secondary effect of their immunodeficiency and not a direct effect of the lack of the ATM protein. The most common examples of such disorders in A–T include immune thrombocytopenia (ITP), several forms of arthritis, and vitiligo.

=== Lung disease ===
Recurrent sinus and lung infections can lead to the development of chronic lung disease. Such infections should be treated with appropriate antibiotics to prevent and limit lung injury. Administration of antibiotics should be considered when children and adults have prolonged respiratory symptoms (greater than 7 days), even following what was presumed to have been a viral infection. To help prevent respiratory illnesses from common respiratory pathogens, annual influenza vaccinations should be given, and pneumococcal vaccines should be administered when appropriate. Antibiotic treatment should also be considered in children with chronic coughs that are productive of mucous, those who do not respond to aggressive pulmonary clearance techniques, and children with mucopurulent secretions from the sinuses or chest. A wet cough can also be associated with chronic aspiration, which should be ruled out through proper diagnostic studies; however, aspiration and respiratory infections are not necessarily exclusive of each other. In children and adults with bronchiectasis, chronic antibiotic therapy should be considered to slow chronic lung disease progression.

Culturing of the sinuses may be needed to direct antibiotic therapy. This can be done by an Ear, Nose, and Throat (ENT) specialist. In addition, diagnostic bronchoscopy may be necessary in people who have recurrent pneumonia, especially those who do not respond or respond incompletely to a course of antibiotics.

Clearance of bronchial secretions is essential for good pulmonary health and can help limit injury from acute and chronic lung infections. Children and adults with increased bronchial secretions can benefit from routine chest therapy using the manual method, an acapella device, or a chest physiotherapy vest. Chest physiotherapy can help bring up mucus from the lower bronchial tree; however, an adequate cough is needed to remove secretions. In people who have decreased lung reserve and a weak cough, the use of an insufflator-exsufflator (cough-assist) device may be useful as maintenance therapy or during acute respiratory illnesses to help remove bronchial secretions from the upper airways. Evaluation by a pulmonology specialist, however, should first be done to properly assess patient suitability.

Children and adults with chronic dry cough, increased work of breathing (fast respiratory rate, shortness of breath at rest or with activities), and absence of an infectious process to explain respiratory symptoms should be evaluated for interstitial lung disease or another intrapulmonary process. Evaluation by a Pulmonologist and a CT scan of the chest should be considered in individuals with symptoms of interstitial lung disease or to rule out other non-infectious pulmonary processes. People diagnosed with interstitial lung disease may benefit from systemic steroids.

=== Feeding, swallowing, and nutrition ===
Oral intake may be aided by teaching persons with A–T how to drink, chew, and swallow more safely. The propriety of treatments for swallowing problems should be determined following evaluation by an expert in the field of speech-language pathology. Dieticians may help treat nutrition problems by recommending dietary modifications, including high-calorie foods or food supplements.

A feeding (gastrostomy) tube is recommended when any of the following occur:

- A child cannot eat enough to grow, or a person of any age cannot eat enough to maintain weight;
- Aspiration is problematic;
- Mealtimes are stressful or too long, interfering with other activities.

=== Education and socialization ===
Most children with A–T have difficulty in school because of a delay in response time to visual, verbal, or other cues, slurred and quiet speech (dysarthria), abnormalities of eye control (oculomotor apraxia), and impaired fine motor control. Despite these problems, children with A–T often enjoy school if proper accommodations for their disability can be made. The decision about the need for special education classes or extra help in regular classes is highly influenced by the local resources available. Decisions about proper educational placement should be revisited as often as circumstances warrant. Despite their many neurologic impairments, most individuals with A–T are very socially aware and socially skilled and thus benefit from sustained peer relationships developed at school. Some individuals can function quite well despite their disabilities, and a few have graduated from community colleges.

Many of the problems encountered will benefit from special attention, as problems are often related more to "input and output" issues than to intellectual impairment. Problems with eye movement control make it difficult for people with A–T to read, yet most fully understand the meaning and nuances of text that is read to them. Delays in speech initiation and a lack of facial expression make it seem that they do not know the answers to questions. Reduction of the skilled effort needed to answer questions and an increase in the time available to respond are often rewarded by real accomplishment. It is important to recognize that intellectual disability is not regularly a part of the clinical picture of A-T, though school performance may be suboptimal because of the many difficulties in reading, writing, and speech. Children with A–T are often very conscious of their appearance and strive to appear normal to their peers and teachers. Life within the ataxic body can be tiring. The enhanced effort needed to maintain appearances and the increased energy expended in abnormal tone and extra movements all contribute to physical and mental fatigue. As a consequence, for some, a shortened school day yields real benefits.

==== General recommendations ====
- All children with A–T need special attention to the barriers they experience in school. In the United States, this takes the form of a formal IEP (Individualized Education Program).
- Children with A–T tend to be excellent problem solvers. Their involvement in how to perform tasks best should be encouraged.
- Speech-language pathologists may facilitate communication skills that enable persons with A–T to get their messages across (using keywords vs. complete sentences) and teach strategies to decrease frustration associated with the increased time needed to respond to questions (e.g., holding up a hand and informing others about the need to allow more time for responses). Rarely helpful are traditional speech therapies that focus on producing specific sounds and the strengthening of the lip and tongue muscles.
- Classroom aides may be appropriate, especially to help with scribing, transportation through the school, mealtimes, and toileting. The impact of an aide on peer relationships should be monitored carefully.
- Physical therapy is useful for maintaining strength and general cardiovascular health. Horseback therapy and exercises in a swimming pool are often well tolerated and fun for people with A–T. However, no amount of practice will slow cerebellar degeneration or improve neurologic function. Exercise to the point of exhaustion should be avoided.
- Hearing is normal throughout life. Books on tape may be a useful adjunct to traditional school materials.
- Early use of computers (preschool) with word completion software should be encouraged.
- Practicing coordination (e.g., balance beam or cursive writing exercises) is not helpful.
- Occupational therapy helps manage daily living skills.
- Allow rest time, shortened days, reduced class schedule, reduced homework, and modified tests as necessary.
- Like all children, those with A–T need to have goals to experience the satisfaction of making progress.
- Social interactions with peers are important and should be taken into consideration for class placement. For everyone, long-term peer relationships can be the most rewarding part of life; for those with A–T, establishing these connections in school years can be helpful.

=== Treatment ===
No curative medication has been approved for the treatment of inherited cerebellar ataxias, including Ataxia-Telangiectasia.

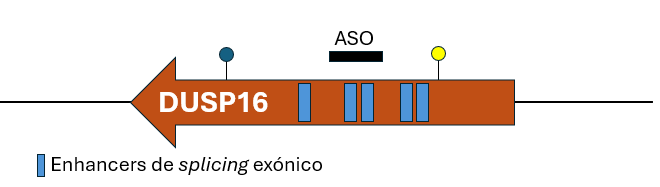
Mechanism of action of ASOs. Enhancers of exonic splicing generated by DUSP16 insertion in ATM are sterically silenced by antisense oligonucleotide binding, as observed in the figure above.

Nonetheless, a new study that identified retroelement insertions in ATM as one of the causes of ATM loss-of-function in A-T patients has also suggested that antisense oligonucleotides might be a viable therapy. In this novel research article, antisense oligonucleotides corrected the mis-splicing caused by retroelement insertion of DUSP16 pseudogene in ATM in vitro, restoring the level of normal ATM transcripts.

==== N-Acetyl-Leucine ====
N-Acetyl-leucine is an orally administered, modified amino acid that is being developed as a novel treatment for multiple rare and common neurological disorders by IntraBio Inc. (Oxford, United Kingdom).

N-Acetyl-Leucine has been granted multiple orphan drug designations from the U.S. Food & Drug Administration (FDA) and the European Medicines Agency (EMA) for the treatment of various genetic diseases, including Ataxia-Telangiectasia. N-Acetyl-leucine has also been granted Orphan Drug Designations in the US and EU for related inherited cerebellar ataxias, such as spinocerebellar ataxias. U.S. Food & Drug Administration (FDA) and the European Medicines Agency (EMA).

Published case series studies have demonstrated the positive clinical benefit of treatment with N-acetyl-leucine in various inherited cerebellar ataxias.

A multinational clinical trial investigating N-acetyl-L-leucine for the treatment ataxia–telangiectasia began in 2019.

IntraBio is also conducting two parallel clinical trials with N-acetyl-L-leucine for the treatment Niemann-Pick disease type C and GM2 Gangliosidosis (Tay–Sachs and Sandhoff disease) Future opportunities to develop N-acetyl-leucine include Lewy body dementia, amyotrophic lateral sclerosis, restless leg syndrome, multiple sclerosis, and migraine.

Levacetylleucine (Aqneursa) approved for medical use in the United States in September 2026.

== Prognosis ==
Median survival in two large cohort studies was 25 and 19 years, with a wide range.

Life expectancy does not correlate well with the severity of neurological impairment.

== Epidemiology ==
Individuals of all races and ethnicities are affected equally. The incidence worldwide is estimated to be between 1 in 40,000 and 1 in 100,000 people.

== Research directions ==
An open-label Phase II clinical trial studying the use of red blood cells (erythrocytes) loaded with dexamethasone sodium phosphate found that this treatment improved symptoms and appeared to be well tolerated. This treatment uses a unique delivery system for medication by using the patient's own red blood cells as the delivery vehicle for the drug.

== History ==
Denise Louis-Bar, from whom it received the name Louis-Bar syndrome, first described the condition in 1941.
