= Aprataxin =

Protein-coding gene in the species Homo sapiens

APTX
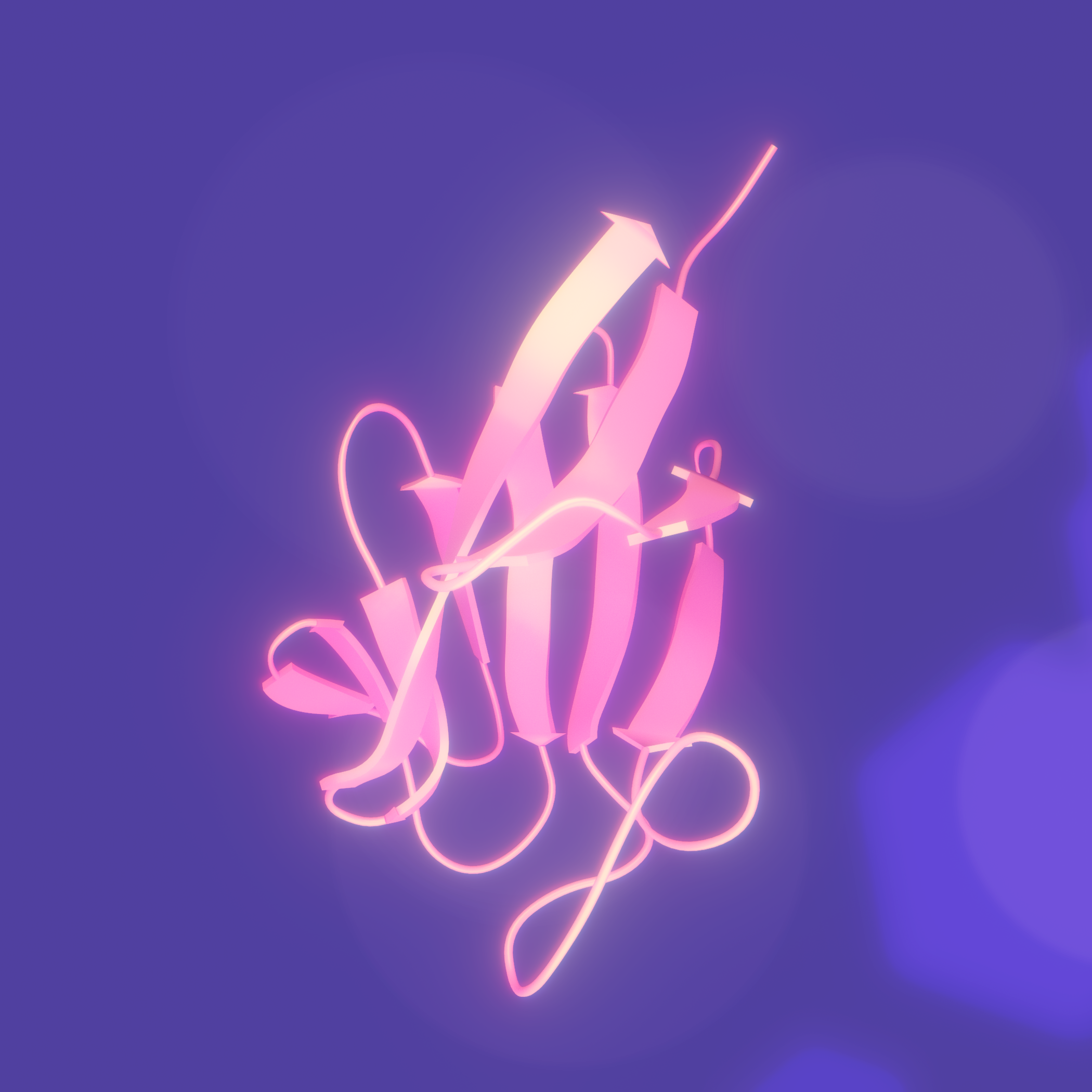

Identifiers
- Aliases: APTX, AOA, AOA1, AXA1, EAOH, EOAHA, FHA-HIT, aprataxin
- External IDs: OMIM: 606350; MGI: 1913658; GeneCards: APTX
Available structures
PDB	Ortholog search: PDBe RCSB
PDB	List of PDB id codes 3KT9, 4NDF, 4NDG, 4NDH, 4NDI
Enzyme activity
EC #	BRENDA	ExPASy	KEGG	MetaCyc
3.6.1.71	↗	↗	↗	↗
3.6.1.72	↗	↗	↗	↗

Gene location (Human)
Chr.	Chromosome 9 (human)
Band	9p21.1	Start	32,972,606 bp
Band	9p21.1	End	33,025,168 bp

Gene location (Mouse)
Chr.	Chromosome 4 (mouse)
Band	4|4 A5	Start	40,682,382 bp
Band	4|4 A5	End	40,703,194 bp
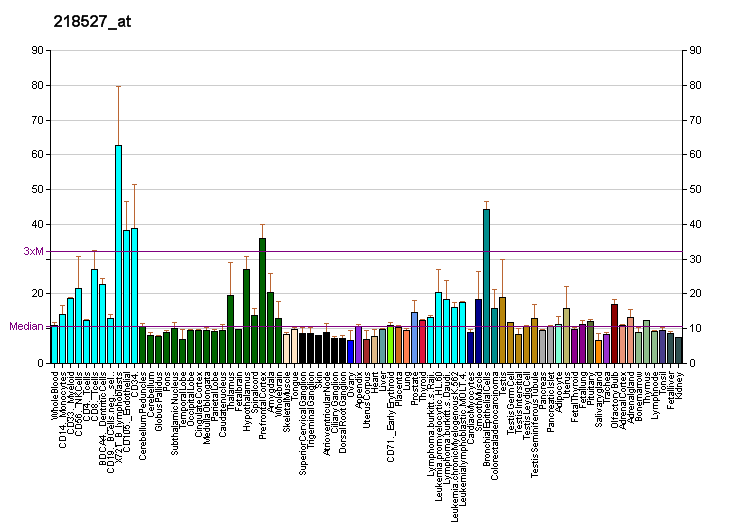
RNA expression pattern
Bgee	Human / Mouse (ortholog); Top expressed in: epithelium of colon; islet of Langerhans; gonad; skin of leg; right adrenal cortex; skin of abdomen; stromal cell of endometrium; left adrenal gland; right uterine tube; mucosa of transverse colon / Top expressed in: seminiferous tubule; spermatid; neural layer of retina; morula; ventricular zone; superior frontal gyrus; granulocyte; ganglionic eminence; muscle of thigh; neural tube; More reference expression data
BioGPS	More reference expression data
Gene ontology
Molecular function	DNA binding; protein N-terminus binding; polynucleotide 3'-phosphatase activity; chromatin binding; metal ion binding; damaged DNA binding; phosphoprotein binding; protein binding; phosphoglycolate phosphatase activity; catalytic activity; double-stranded RNA binding; double-stranded DNA binding; hydrolase activity; DNA 5'-adenosine monophosphate hydrolase activity; nucleic acid binding; DNA-3'-diphospho-5'-guanosine diphosphatase; single-stranded DNA binding; mismatched DNA binding; single-strand break-containing DNA binding
Cellular component	cytoplasm; chromatin; nucleolus; nucleus; nucleoplasm
Biological process	regulation of protein stability; cellular response to DNA damage stimulus; DNA ligation; double-strand break repair; response to hydrogen peroxide; DNA repair; polynucleotide 3' dephosphorylation; nucleic acid phosphodiester bond hydrolysis; single strand break repair; dephosphorylation
Sources:Amigo / QuickGO
Orthologs
Databases	NCBI: entry; OMA: entry
Species	Human	Mouse
Entrez	54840	66408
Ensembl	ENSG00000137074	ENSMUSG00000028411
UniProt	Q7Z2E3	Q7TQC5
RefSeq (mRNA)	NM_001195248; NM_001195249; NM_001195250; NM_001195251; NM_001195252 NM_001195254; NM_017692; NM_175069; NM_175072; NM_175073	NM_001025444; NM_001025445; NM_025545
RefSeq (protein)	NP_001182177; NP_001182178; NP_001182179; NP_001182180; NP_001182181 NP_001182183; NP_778239; NP_778243; NP_001355924; NP_001355925; NP_001355926; NP_001355927; NP_001355928; NP_001355929; NP_001355930; NP_001355931; NP_001355932; NP_001355933; NP_001355934; NP_001355935; NP_001357598; NP_001357599; NP_001357602	NP_001020615; NP_001020616; NP_079821
Location (UCSC)	Chr 9: 32.97 – 33.03 Mb	Chr 4: 40.68 – 40.7 Mb
PubMed search
- Wikidata
View/Edit Human	View/Edit Mouse

Aprataxin is a protein that in humans is encoded by the APTX gene.

This gene encodes a member of the histidine triad (HIT) superfamily, some of which have nucleotide-binding and diadenosine polyphosphate hydrolase activities. The encoded protein may play a role in single-stranded DNA repair. Mutations in this gene have been associated with ataxia–ocular apraxia. Multiple transcript variants encoding distinct isoforms have been identified for this gene, however, the full length nature of some variants has not been determined.

== Function ==
Aprataxin removes AMP from DNA ends following abortive ligation attempts by DNA Ligase IV during non-homologous end joining, thereby permitting subsequent attempts at ligation.

== DNA strand breaks ==
Ataxia with oculomotor apraxia type 1 is a neurological disorder caused by mutations in the APTX gene that encodes aprataxin. The neurological disorder appears to be caused by the gradual accumulation of unrepaired DNA strand breaks resulting from abortive DNA ligation events.

== Premature aging ==
Aptx^{−/−} mutant mice have been generated, but they lack an obvious phenotype. Another mouse model was generated in which a mutation of superoxide dismutase I (SOD1) is expressed in an Aptx^{−/−} mouse. The SOD1 mutation causes a reduction in transcription recovery following oxidative stress. These mice showed accelerated cellular senescence. This study also demonstrated a protective role of Aptx in vivo and suggested that the loss of Aptx function results in progressive accumulation of DNA breaks in the nervous system, triggering hallmarks of systemic premature aging (see DNA damage theory of aging).

== Interactions ==
Aprataxin has been shown to interact with:

- PARP1,
- P53,
- XRCC1, and
- XRCC4.
