= Cerebellar ataxia =

Motor symptoms caused by dysfunction of the cerebellum

- Specialty: Neurology

Cerebellar ataxia is a form of ataxia originating in the cerebellum. Non-progressive congenital ataxia (NPCA) is a classical presentation of cerebral ataxias.

Cerebellar ataxia can occur as a result of many diseases and may present with symptoms of an inability to coordinate balance, gait, extremity and eye movements. Lesions to the cerebellum can cause dyssynergia, dysmetria, dysdiadochokinesia, dysarthria and ataxia of stance and gait. Deficits are observed with movements on the same side of the body as the lesion (ipsilateral). Clinicians often use visual observation of people performing motor tasks in order to look for signs of ataxia.

== Signs and symptoms ==
Damage to the cerebellum causes impairment in motor skills and can cause nystagmus. Almost a third of people with isolated, late onset cerebellar ataxia go on to develop multiple system atrophy.

The cerebellum's role has been observed as not purely motor. It is combined with intellect, emotion and planning. Cerebellar deficits can be estimated using clinical rating scales, such as SODA for ocular deficits.

== Causes ==
A male with gluten ataxia: previous situation and evolution after 3 months of gluten-free diet.

There are many causes of cerebellar ataxia including, among others, gluten ataxia; autoimmunity to Purkinje cells or other neural cells in the cerebellum; CNS vasculitis; multiple sclerosis; infection; bleeding; infarction; tumors; direct injury; toxins (e.g., alcohol); genetic disorders and neurodegenerative diseases (such as progressive supranuclear palsy and multiple system atrophy). Gluten ataxia accounts for 40% of all sporadic idiopathic ataxias and 15% of all ataxias.

Primary auto-immune ataxias (PACA) lack diagnostic biomarkers. Cerebellar ataxias can be classified as sporadic, autosomal recessive, X-linked, autosomal dominant and of mitochondrial origin.

== Treatment ==
For many years, it was thought that postural and balance disorders in cerebellar ataxia were not treatable. However, the results of several recent studies suggest that rehabilitation can relieve postural disorders in patients with cerebellar ataxia. There is now moderate level evidence that rehabilitation is efficient to improve postural capacities of patients with cerebellar ataxia – particularly in patients with degenerative ataxia or multiple sclerosis. Intensive rehabilitation programs with balance and coordination exercises are necessary. Although techniques such as virtual reality, biofeedback, treadmill exercises with supported bodyweight and torso weighting appear to be of value, their specific efficacy has to be further investigated. Drugs have only been studied in degenerative ataxia, and the level of evidence is low.

Some effects of cerebellar ataxia may be reduced to varying degrees by means of Frenkel exercises.

One main objective of the treatment is to re-establish the physiological inhibition exerted by the cerebellar cortex over cerebellar nuclei. Research using Transcranial direct-current stimulation (TDCS) and Transcranial magnetic stimulation (TMS) shows promising results.

Additionally, mild to moderate cerebellar ataxia may be treatable with buspirone.

It is thought that the buspirone increases the serotonin levels in the cerebellum and so decreases ataxia.

=== Behavioral intervention ===
Behavioral intervention is successful when it involves engaging knowledge of the interests and general backgrounds of individuals with cerebellar ataxia. An intervention technique for speech is to focus on optimizing respiratory and vocal resources as well as training compensatory strategies.

== See also ==
- Autosomal recessive cerebellar ataxia
- Sensory ataxia
- Spinocerebellar ataxia
- Vestibulocerebellar syndrome
