= APEX1 =

Protein-coding gene in the species Homo sapiens

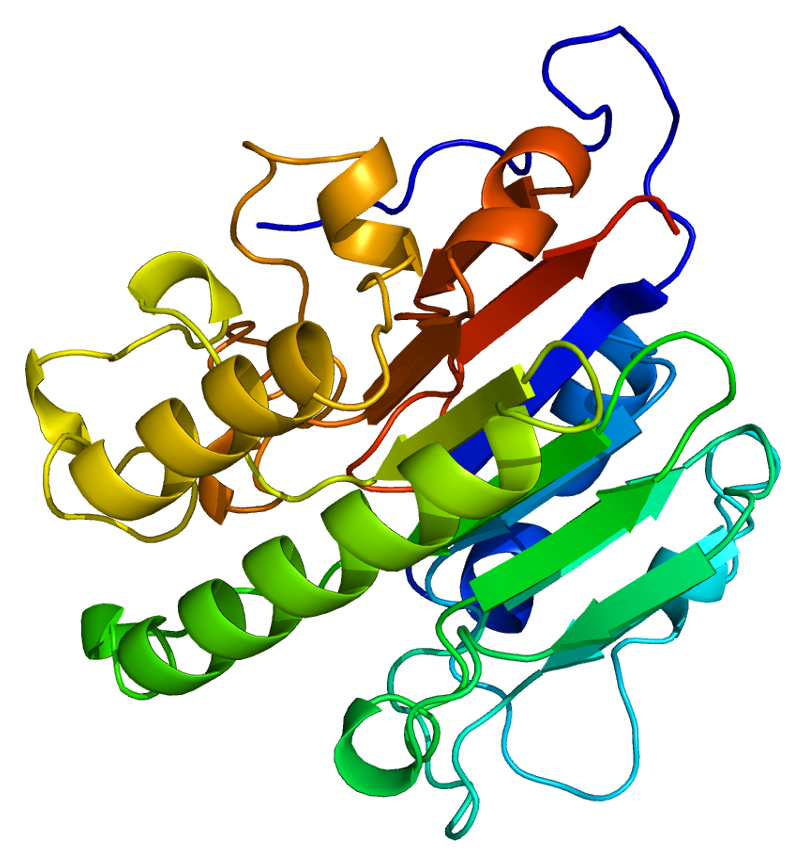

Identifiers
- Aliases: APEX1, APE, APE1, APEN, APEX, APX, HAP1, REF1, apurinic/apyrimidinic endodeoxyribonuclease 1
- External IDs: OMIM: 107748; MGI: 88042; GeneCards: APEX1
Available structures
PDB	Ortholog search: PDBe RCSB
PDB	List of PDB id codes 1BIX, 1CQH, 4LND, 4QH9, 5DFF, 4QHD, 1E9N, 3U8U, 5DFI, 1HD7, 5DG0, 5DFJ, 4QHE, 5DFH, 1DE9, 4IEM, 2ISI, 1DE8, 2O3H, 1CQG, 1DEW, 5CFG
Enzyme activity
EC #	BRENDA	ExPASy	KEGG	MetaCyc
3.1.11.2	↗	↗	↗	↗

Gene location (Human)
Chr.	Chromosome 14 (human)
Band	14q11.2	Start	20,455,191 bp
Band	14q11.2	End	20,457,772 bp

Gene location (Mouse)
Chr.	Chromosome 14 (mouse)
Band	14 C1|14 26.3 cM	Start	51,162,425 bp
Band	14 C1|14 26.3 cM	End	51,164,596 bp
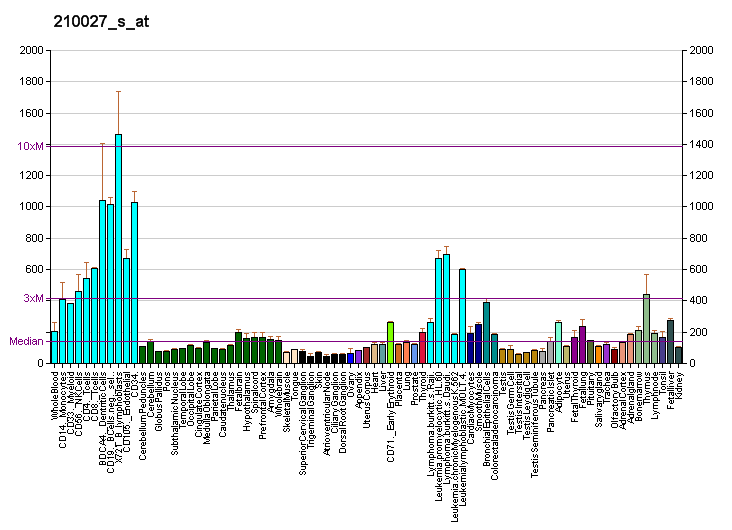
RNA expression pattern
Bgee	Human / Mouse (ortholog); Top expressed in: ganglionic eminence; ventricular zone; islet of Langerhans; right adrenal gland; right adrenal cortex; left ovary; right ovary; left adrenal cortex; gallbladder; rectum / Top expressed in: primitive streak; internal carotid artery; external carotid artery; abdominal wall; epiblast; condyle; maxillary prominence; mandibular prominence; medial ganglionic eminence; embryo; More reference expression data
BioGPS	More reference expression data
Gene ontology
Molecular function	DNA binding; nuclease activity; endonuclease activity; hydrolase activity; metal ion binding; lyase activity; class I DNA-(apurinic or apyrimidinic site) endonuclease activity; protein-containing complex binding; protein binding; exonuclease activity; phosphodiesterase I activity; double-stranded DNA 3'-5' exodeoxyribonuclease activity; endodeoxyribonuclease activity; chromatin DNA binding; endoribonuclease activity; uracil DNA N-glycosylase activity; phosphoric diester hydrolase activity; site-specific endodeoxyribonuclease activity, specific for altered base; double-stranded telomeric DNA binding; oxidoreductase activity; double-stranded DNA exodeoxyribonuclease activity; transcription coactivator activity; NF-kappaB binding; RNA-DNA hybrid ribonuclease activity; damaged DNA binding; transcription corepressor activity; 3'-5' exonuclease activity; DNA-(apurinic or apyrimidinic site) endonuclease activity; RNA binding; class III/IV DNA-(apurinic or apyrimidinic site) endonuclease activity
Cellular component	cytoplasm; centrosome; intracellular anatomical structure; mitochondrion; nucleus; perinuclear region of cytoplasm; ribosome; transcription regulator complex; nuclear speck; nucleoplasm; nucleolus; endoplasmic reticulum
Biological process	DNA repair; nucleic acid phosphodiester bond hydrolysis; cellular response to DNA damage stimulus; DNA recombination; positive regulation of G1/S transition of mitotic cell cycle; negative regulation of smooth muscle cell migration; regulation of transcription, DNA-templated; DNA demethylation; cellular response to cAMP; RNA phosphodiester bond hydrolysis, endonucleolytic; transcription, DNA-templated; response to organonitrogen compound; cellular response to hydrogen peroxide; cellular response to peptide hormone stimulus; regulation of mRNA stability; cellular response to organonitrogen compound; cell redox homeostasis; ageing; base-excision repair; telomere maintenance; negative regulation of nucleic acid-templated transcription; telomere maintenance via base-excision repair; regulation of apoptotic process; positive regulation of nucleic acid-templated transcription
Sources:Amigo / QuickGO
Orthologs
Databases	NCBI: entry; OMA: entry
Species	Human	Mouse
Entrez	328	11792
Ensembl	ENSG00000100823	ENSMUSG00000035960
UniProt	P27695	P28352
RefSeq (mRNA)	NM_001244249; NM_001641; NM_080648; NM_080649	NM_009687
RefSeq (protein)	NP_001231178; NP_001632; NP_542379; NP_542380	NP_033817
Location (UCSC)	Chr 14: 20.46 – 20.46 Mb	Chr 14: 51.16 – 51.16 Mb
PubMed search
- Wikidata
View/Edit Human	View/Edit Mouse

DNA-(apurinic or apyrimidinic site) lyase is an enzyme that in humans is encoded by the APEX1 gene.

Apurinic/apyrimidinic (AP) sites (also called "abasic sites") occur frequently in DNA molecules by spontaneous hydrolysis, by DNA damaging agents or by DNA glycosylases that remove specific abnormal bases. AP sites are pre-mutagenic lesions that can prevent normal DNA replication. All cells, from simple prokaryotes to humans, have evolved systems to identify and repair such sites. Class II AP endonucleases cleave the phosphodiester backbone 5' to the AP site, thereby initiating a process known as base excision repair (BER). The APEX1 gene (alternatively named APE1, HAP1, APEN) encodes the major AP endonuclease in human cells. Splice variants have been found for this gene; all encode the same protein.

== Interactions ==
APEX1 has been shown to interact with MUTYH, Flap structure-specific endonuclease 1 and XRCC1.

== Aging ==
Deficiency of APEX1 causes accummulation of DNA damage leading to both cellular senescence and features of premature aging. This finding is consistent with the theory that DNA damage is a primary cause of aging.
