= DNA-3-methyladenine glycosylase =

Protein-coding gene in the species Homo sapiens

MPG
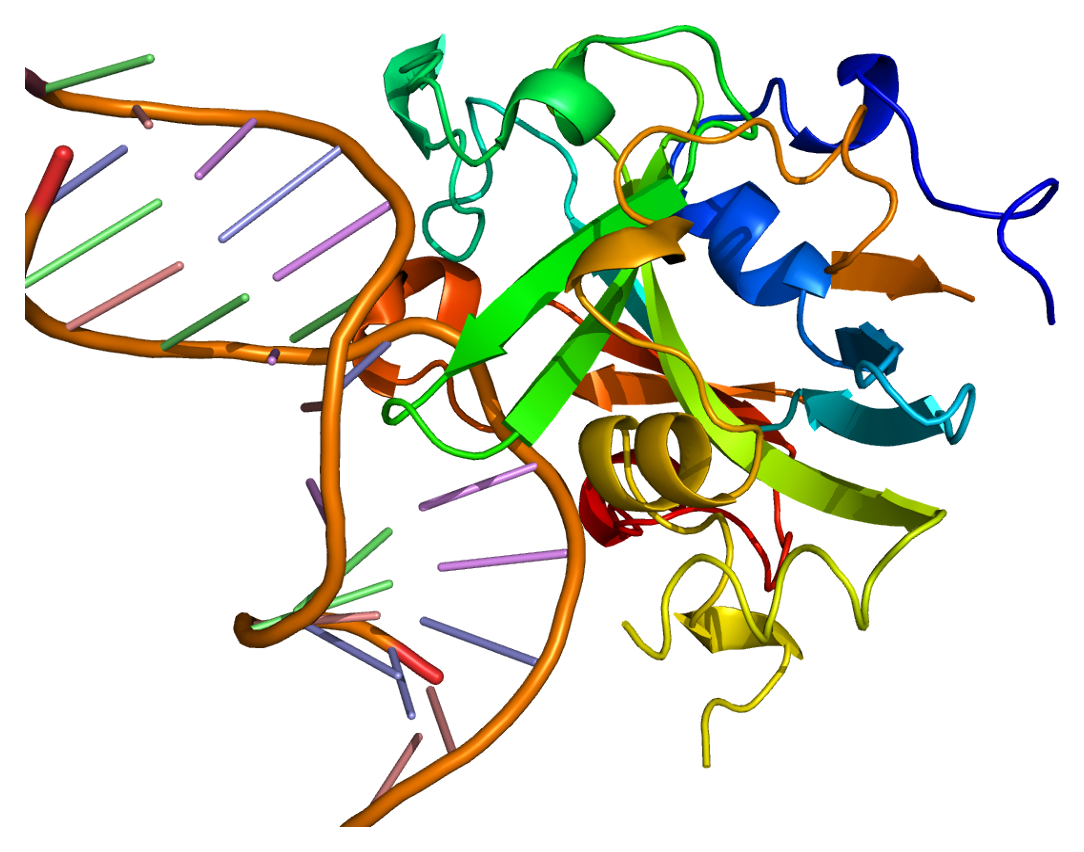

Identifiers
- Aliases: MPG, AAG, ADPG, APNG, CRA36.1, MDG, Mid1, PIG11, PIG16, anpg, N-methylpurine DNA glycosylase
- External IDs: OMIM: 156565; MGI: 97073; GeneCards: MPG
Available structures
PDB	Ortholog search: PDBe RCSB
PDB	List of PDB id codes 1BNK, 1EWN, 1F4R, 1F6O, 3QI5, 3UBY
Enzyme activity
EC #	BRENDA	ExPASy	KEGG	MetaCyc
3.2.2.21	↗	↗	↗	↗

Gene location (Human)
Chr.	Chromosome 16 (human)
Band	16p13.3	Start	77,007 bp
Band	16p13.3	End	85,851 bp

Gene location (Mouse)
Chr.	Chromosome 11 (mouse)
Band	11 A4|11 18.83 cM	Start	32,176,505 bp
Band	11 A4|11 18.83 cM	End	32,182,700 bp
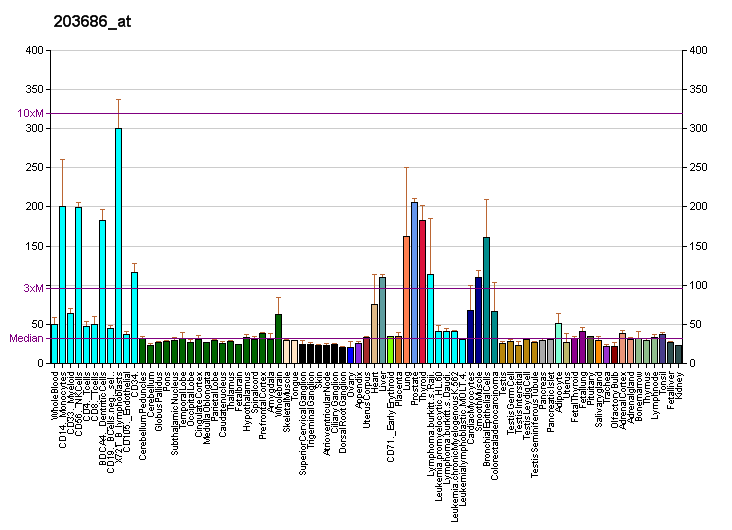
RNA expression pattern
Bgee	Human / Mouse (ortholog); Top expressed in: ascending aorta; Descending thoracic aorta; right coronary artery; stromal cell of endometrium; left coronary artery; tibial arteries; gastric mucosa; left adrenal cortex; right lung; right adrenal gland / Top expressed in: parotid gland; proximal tubule; seminal vesicula; efferent ductule; renal corpuscle; fossa; right kidney; lumbar subsegment of spinal cord; molar; seminiferous tubule; More reference expression data
BioGPS	More reference expression data
Gene ontology
Molecular function	DNA-7-methylguanine glycosylase activity; DNA-7-methyladenine glycosylase activity; damaged DNA binding; DNA binding; alkylbase DNA N-glycosylase activity; protein binding; DNA-3-methylguanine glycosylase activity; catalytic activity; hydrolase activity; DNA-3-methyladenine glycosylase activity; DNA N-glycosylase activity
Cellular component	cytoplasm; mitochondrial nucleoid; mitochondrion; nucleus; nucleoplasm
Biological process	depurination; DNA dealkylation involved in DNA repair; base-excision repair; cellular response to DNA damage stimulus; DNA repair
Sources:Amigo / QuickGO
Orthologs
Databases	NCBI: entry; OMA: entry
Species	Human	Mouse
Entrez	4350	268395
Ensembl	ENSG00000103152	ENSMUSG00000020287
UniProt	P29372	Q04841
RefSeq (mRNA)	NM_002434; NM_001015052; NM_001015054	NM_010822
RefSeq (protein)	NP_001015052; NP_001015054; NP_002425	NP_034952
Location (UCSC)	Chr 16: 0.08 – 0.09 Mb	Chr 11: 32.18 – 32.18 Mb
PubMed search
- Wikidata
View/Edit Human	View/Edit Mouse

DNA-3-methyladenine glycosylase also known as 3-alkyladenine DNA glycosylase (AAG) or N-methylpurine DNA glycosylase (MPG) is an enzyme that in humans is encoded by the MPG gene.

Alkyladenine DNA glycosylase is a specific type of DNA glycosylase. This subfamily of monofunctional glycosylases is involved in the recognition of a variety of base lesions, including alkylated and deaminated purines, and initiating their repair via the base excision repair pathway. To date, the human AAG (hAAG) is the only glycosylase identified that excises alkylation-damaged purine bases in human cells.

== Function ==
DNA bases are subject to a large number of anomalies: spontaneous alkylation or oxidative deamination. It is estimated that 10^{4} mutations appear in a typical human cell per day. Albeit it seems to be an insignificant amount considering the extension of the DNA (10^{10} nucleotides), these mutations lead to changes in the structure and coding potential of the DNA, affecting processes of replication and transcription.

3-Methyladenine DNA glycosylases are able to initiate the base excision repair (BER) of a wide range of substrate bases that, due to their chemical reactivity, suffer inevitable modifications resulting in different biological outcomes. DNA repair mechanisms take on a vital role in maintaining the genomic integrity of cells from different organisms, in particular 3-Methyladenine DNA glycosylases are found in bacteria, yeast, plants, rodents, and humans. Therefore, there are different subfamilies of this enzyme, such as the Human Alkyladenine DNA Glycosylase (hAAG), that act on other damaged DNA bases apart from 3-MeA.

Table that shows the presence (+) or absence (-) of biochemical activity between the different subfamilies of the DNA-3-methyladenine glycosylase and the different types of damaged DNA bases
	tag	AlkA	MAG	mag1	ADPG	Aag	AGG	aMAG
3-MeA	+	+	+	+	+	+	+	+
3-MeG	+	+	+			+	+	+
7-MeG	-	+	+	+	+	+	+	+
O2-MeG	-	+						
O2-MeC	-	+						
7-CEG		+	+					
7-HEG		+	+					
7-EthoxyG		+						
eA	-	+	+		+	+	+	+
eG							+	
8-oxoG						+	+	
Hx	-	+	+		+	+	+	+
A		+			+			
G	-	+	+		+	+		
T		+						
C		+						

=== Alkylation repairing activity ===
In cells, AAG is the enzyme responsible for recognition and initiation of the repair, via catalysing the hydrolysis of the N-glycosidic bond to release the alkylation-damaged purine bases. Specifically, hAAG is able to efficiently identify and excise 3-methyladenine, 7-methyladenine, 7-methylguanine, 1N-ethenoadenine and hypoxanthine.

=== Deaminated base activity ===
MPG can act on all three purine deamination bases: hypoxanthine, xanthine, and oxanine.

Oxanine (Oxa), is a deaminated base lesion in which the N1-nitrogen is replaced by oxygen. Contrary to the alkylation repairing activity, which is only able to act against purine bases, the hAAG is able to excise Oxa from all of four Oxa-containing double stranded base pairs, Cyt/Oxa, Thy/Oxa, Ade/Oxa, and Gua/Oxa, showing no particular preference by any of the bases. In addition hAAG is capable of removing Oxa from single-stranded Oxa- containing DNA. This occurs because the ODG activity of the hAAG does not require a complementary strand.

== Structure ==
Alkyladenine DNA glycosylase is a monomeric protein compounded by 298 amino acids, with a formula weight of 33kDa. Its canonical primary structure consists of the following sequence. However, also other functional isoforms have been found.

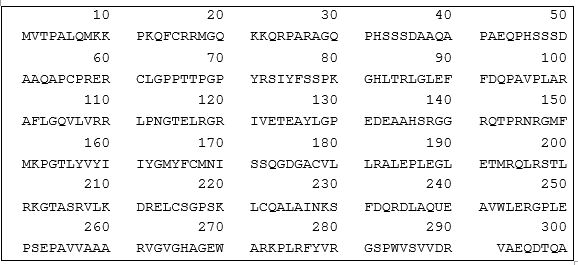
Human Alkyladenine DNA Glycosylase Sequence or Isoform 1

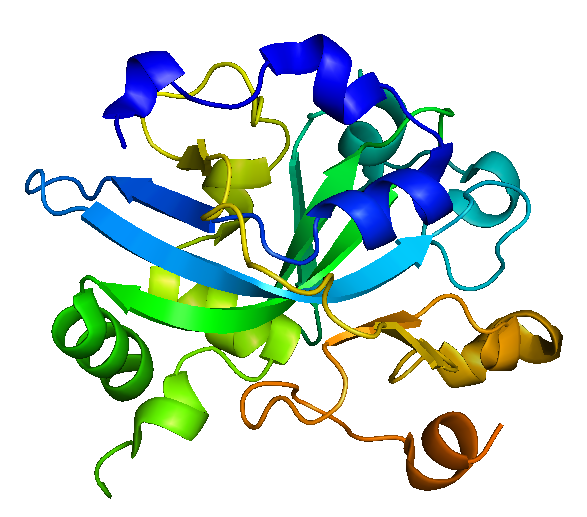
Human Alkyladenine DNA Glycosylase's structure generated with Pymol

=== Isoform 2 ===
The sequence of this isoform differs from the canonical sequence as follows:

Aminoacids 1-12: MVTPALQMKKPK → MPARSGA

Aminoacids 195-196: QL →HV

=== Isoform 3 ===
The sequence of this isoform differs from the canonical sequence in a similar way as the isoform 2:

Aminoacids 1-12: MVTPALQMKKPK → MPARSGA

=== Isoform 4 ===
The sequence of this isoform misses the aminoacids 1–17.

It folds into a single domain of mixed α/β structure, with seven α helices and eight β strands. The core of the protein consists of a curved, antiparallel β sheet with a protruding β hairpin (β3β4) that inserts into the minor groove of the bound DNA. A series of α helices and connecting loops form the remainder of the DNA binding interface. It lacks the helix-hairpin-helix motif associated with other base excision-repair proteins and, in fact, it does not resemble any other model in the Protein Data Bank.

== Mechanism ==
=== Substrate recognition ===
Alkyladenine DNA glycosylase is part of the family of enzymes that follow the BER, acting on specific substrates according to BER steps.

The process of recognition of damaged bases involves initial non-specific binding followed by diffusion along the DNA. Formed the AAG-DNA complex, a redundant process of search occurs because of the long lifetime of this complex, while hAAG search many adjacent sites in a DNA molecule in a single binding. This provides ample opportunity to recognize and excise lesions that minimally perturb the structure of the DNA.

Due to its broad specificity, the hAAG performs the substrate selection through a combination of selectivity filters.

- The first selectivity filter occurs at the nucleotide flipping step of unusable base pairs that present lesions.
- The second selectivity filter is constituted by the catalytic mechanism which ensures that only purine bases are excised, even though smaller pyrimidines can fit in the hAAG's active site. The active site pocket it's designed to accommodate a structurally diverse set of modified purines so it would be difficult to sterically exclude the smaller pyrimidine bases from binding. However, thanks to the different shape and chemical properties of a bound pyrimidine and a purine substrate, the acid-catalyzed reacts only with the pyrimidine preventing it from binding with the hAAG.
- The third selectivity filter consist of unfavorable steric clashes that allow a preferential recognition of purine lesions lacking exocyclic amino groups of guanine and adenine.
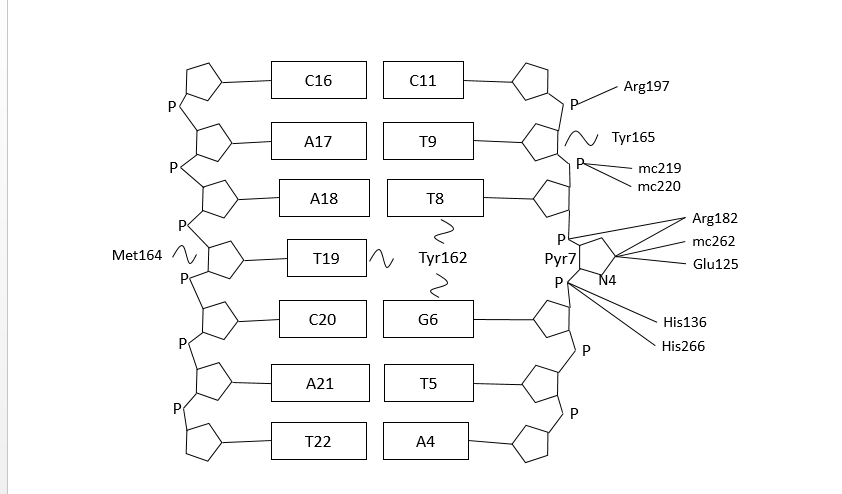
  Schematic diagram of hAAG-DNA contacts

=== Nucleotide flipping and fixation ===
Its structure contains an antiparallel β sheet with protruding β hairpin (β3β4) that inserts into the minor groove of the bound DNA. This group is unique for the human cells and displaces the selected nucleotide targeted for base excision by flipping it. The nucleotide is secured into the enzyme binding pocket where the active site is found, and is fixed by the amino acids Arg182, Glu125 and Ser262. Also other bonds are formed to bordering nucleotides to stabilize the structure.

The groove in the double helix of DNA left by the flipped-out abasic nucleotide is filled with the lateral chain of the amino acid Tyr162, making no specific contacts with the surrounding bases.

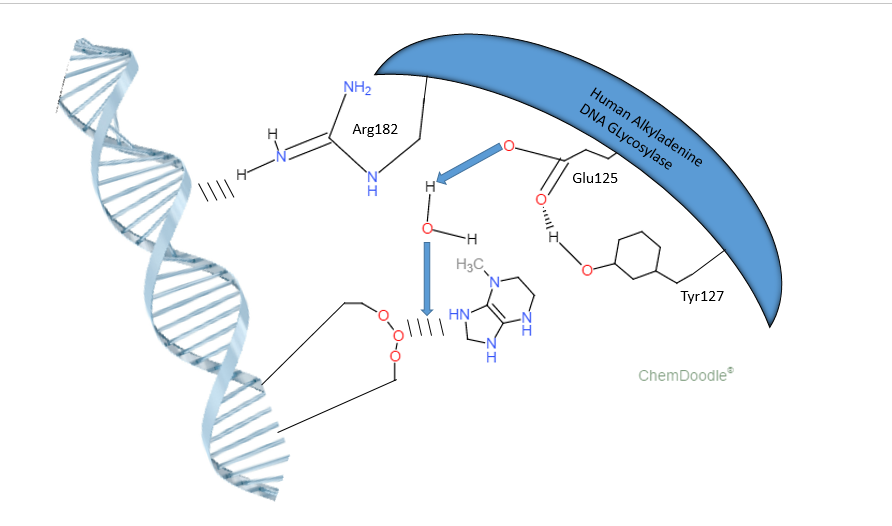
N-Glycosidic bond cleavage by Human Alkyladenine DNA Glycosylase

=== Nucleotide release ===
Activated by nearby aminoacids, a water molecule attacks the N-Glycosydic bound releasing the alkylated base via a backside displacement mechanism.

== Location ==
Human alkyladenine DNA glycosylase localizes to the mitochondria, nucleus and cytoplasm of human cells. Some functionally equivalent enzymes have been found in other species have significantly different structures, such as DNA-3-methyladenine glycosylase in E. coli.

== Clinical significance ==
According to the mechanism used by Human Alkyladenine DNA Glycosylase, a defect in the DNA repair pathways leads to cancer predisposition. HAAG follows the BER steps so that means that an incorrect role of BER genes could contribute to the development of cancer. Concretely, a bad activity of hAAG may be associated with cancer risk in BRCA1 and BRCA2 mutation carriers.

=== Aging ===
As noted above, DNA-3-methyladenine glycosylase (also called 3-alklyadeneine DNA glycosylase or AAG) is able to identify and excise a variety of alkylation damaged purine bases. Such damages to purine bases occur spontaneously in DNA. Double-mutant mice deficient both for AAG and another enzyme that specifically repairs O6MeG damages (O-6-methylguanine-DNA methyltransferase) had a shorter lifespan and aged more rapidly than wild type mice. These findings indicate that damaged purine bases contribute to the aging process, consistent with the DNA damage theory of aging.

== See also ==
- DNA-3-methyladenine glycosylase II
- MGMT
- ALKBH1
