= Alkylated-DNA glycohydrolase (releasing methyladenine and methylguanine) =

Alkylated-DNA glycohydrolase (releasing methyladenine and methylguanine) may refer to:

- DNA-3-methyladenine glycosylase I, an enzyme
- DNA-3-methyladenine glycosylase II, an enzyme
