= DNA polymerase beta =

Protein-coding gene in the species Homo sapiens

POLB
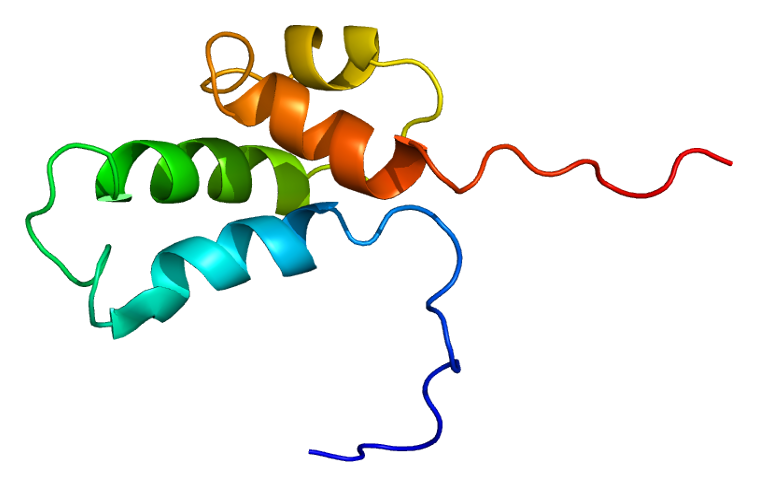

Identifiers
- Aliases: POLB, DNA polymerase beta
- External IDs: OMIM: 174760; MGI: 97740; GeneCards: POLB
Available structures
PDB	Ortholog search: PDBe RCSB
PDB	List of PDB id codes 1BPX, 1BPY, 1BPZ, 1MQ2, 1MQ3, 1TV9, 1TVA, 1ZJM, 1ZJN, 1ZQA, 1ZQB, 1ZQC, 1ZQD, 1ZQE, 1ZQF, 1ZQG, 1ZQH, 1ZQI, 1ZQJ, 1ZQK, 1ZQL, 1ZQM, 1ZQN, 1ZQO, 1ZQP, 1ZQQ, 1ZQR, 1ZQS, 1ZQT, 2FMP, 2FMQ, 2FMS, 2I9G, 2ISO, 2ISP, 2P66, 2PXI, 3C2K, 3C2L, 3C2M, 3GDX, 3ISB, 3ISC, 3ISD, 3JPN, 3JPO, 3JPP, 3JPQ, 3JPR, 3JPS, 3JPT, 3LK9, 3MBY, 3OGU, 3RH4, 3RH5, 3RH6, 3RJE, 3RJF, 3RJG, 3RJH, 3RJI, 3RJJ, 3RJK, 3TFR, 3TFS, 4DO9, 4DOA, 4DOB, 4DOC, 4F5N, 4F5O, 4F5P, 4F5Q, 4F5R, 4GXI, 4GXJ, 4GXK, 4JWM, 4JWN, 4KLD, 4KLE, 4KLF, 4KLG, 4KLH, 4KLI, 4KLJ, 4KLL, 4KLM, 4KLO, 4KLQ, 4KLS, 4KLT, 4KLU, 4LVS, 4M2Y, 4M47, 4M9G, 4M9H, 4M9J, 4M9L, 4M9N, 4MF2, 4MF8, 4MFA, 4MFC, 4MFF, 4NLK, 4NLN, 4NLZ, 4NM1, 4NM2, 4NXZ, 4NY8, 4O5C, 4O5E, 4O5K, 4O9M, 4P2H, 4PGQ, 4PGX, 4PGY, 4PH5, 4PHA, 4PHD, 4PHE, 4PHP, 4PPX, 4R63, 4R64, 4R65, 4R66, 4RPX, 4RPY, 4RPZ, 4RQ0, 4RQ1, 4RQ2, 4RQ3, 4RQ4, 4RQ5, 4RQ6, 4RQ7, 4RQ8, 4RT2, 4RT3, 4TUP, 4TUQ, 4TUR, 4TUS, 4UAW, 4UAY, 4UAZ, 4UB1, 4UB2, 4UB3, 4UB4, 4UB5, 4UBB, 4UBC, 7ICE, 7ICF, 7ICG, 7ICH, 7ICI, 7ICJ, 7ICK, 7ICL, 7ICM, 7ICN, 7ICO, 7ICP, 7ICQ, 7ICR, 7ICS, 7ICT, 7ICU, 7ICV, 8ICA, 8ICB, 8ICC, 8ICE, 8ICF, 8ICG, 8ICH, 8ICI, 8ICJ, 8ICK, 8ICL, 8ICM, 8ICN, 8ICO, 8ICP, 8ICQ, 8ICR, 8ICS, 8ICT, 8ICU, 8ICV, 8ICW, 8ICX, 8ICY, 8ICZ, 9ICA, 9ICB, 9ICC, 9ICE, 9ICF, 9ICG, 9ICH, 9ICI, 9ICJ, 9ICK, 9ICL, 9ICM, 9ICN, 9ICO, 9ICP, 9ICQ, 9ICR, 9ICS, 9ICT, 9ICU, 9ICV, 9ICW, 9ICX, 9ICY, 5BOL, 5BOM, 5BPC, 5DB8, 5DBB, 5DBA, 5DB7, 5DBC, 5DB9, 5DB6, 4YMN, 4YN4, 4YMO, 4YMM, 4Z6C, 4Z6F, 4Z6D, 4Z6E
Enzyme activity
EC #	BRENDA	ExPASy	KEGG	MetaCyc
2.7.7.7	↗	↗	↗	↗
4.2.99.18	↗	↗	↗	↗

Gene location (Mouse)
Chr.	Chromosome 8 (mouse)
Band	8 A2|8 11.42 cM	Start	23,118,142 bp
Band	8 A2|8 11.42 cM	End	23,143,451 bp
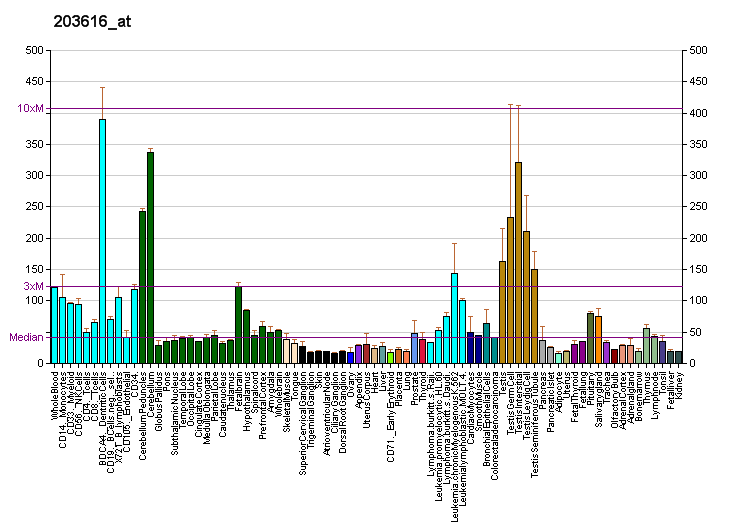
RNA expression pattern
Bgee	Human / Mouse (ortholog); Top expressed in: oocyte; cerebellar hemisphere; secondary oocyte; sperm; cerebellar vermis; ganglionic eminence; thoracic diaphragm; parotid gland; monocyte; pons / Top expressed in: spermatid; spermatocyte; seminiferous tubule; intercostal muscle; transitional epithelium of urinary bladder; hair follicle; Rostral migratory stream; vestibular sensory epithelium; facial motor nucleus; fossa; More reference expression data
BioGPS	More reference expression data
Gene ontology
Molecular function	transferase activity; DNA binding; nucleotidyltransferase activity; microtubule binding; metal ion binding; damaged DNA binding; protein binding; lyase activity; enzyme binding; DNA-directed DNA polymerase activity; DNA-(apurinic or apyrimidinic site) endonuclease activity; DNA polymerase; DNA polymerase activity
Cellular component	cytoplasm; nucleoplasm; spindle microtubule; microtubule; nucleus; protein-containing complex
Biological process	neuron apoptotic process; somatic hypermutation of immunoglobulin genes; pyrimidine dimer repair; nucleotide-excision repair, DNA gap filling; DNA-dependent DNA replication; DNA biosynthetic process; homeostasis of number of cells; response to hyperoxia; ageing; spleen development; salivary gland morphogenesis; cellular response to DNA damage stimulus; immunoglobulin heavy chain V-D-J recombination; DNA replication; somatic diversification of immunoglobulins; base-excision repair, gap-filling; intrinsic apoptotic signaling pathway in response to DNA damage; response to ethanol; inflammatory response; lymph node development; response to gamma radiation; DNA repair; apoptotic process; base-excision repair; base-excision repair, DNA ligation; protein deubiquitination; double-strand break repair via nonhomologous end joining
Sources:Amigo / QuickGO
Orthologs
Databases	NCBI: entry; OMA: entry
Species	Human	Mouse
Entrez	5423	18970
Ensembl	ENSG00000070501	ENSMUSG00000031536
UniProt	P06746	Q8K409
RefSeq (mRNA)	NM_002690	NM_011130
RefSeq (protein)	NP_002681	NP_035260
Location (UCSC)	n/a	Chr 8: 23.12 – 23.14 Mb
PubMed search
- Wikidata
View/Edit Human	View/Edit Mouse

Stem loopII regulatory element in POLB
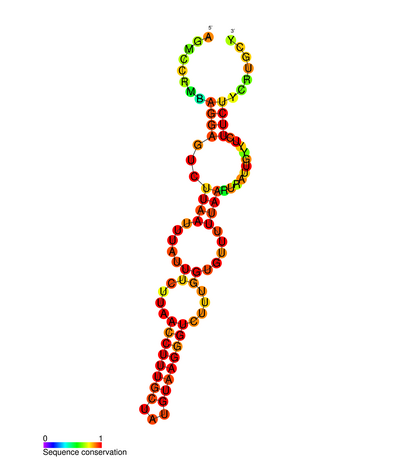
- Predicted secondary structure of the stem loopII (M2) regulatory element in POLB

Identifiers
- Symbol: POLB
- Rfam: RF01455
- NCBI Gene: 5423
- HGNC: 9174
- OMIM: 174760
- RefSeq: NM_002690

Other data
- RNA type: Cis-reg
- Domain: Mammalia
- Locus: Chr. 8 p11.2
- PDB structures: PDBe

DNA polymerase beta, also known as POLB, is an enzyme present in eukaryotes. In humans, it is encoded by the POLB gene.

== Function ==
In eukaryotic cells, DNA polymerase beta (POLB) performs base excision repair (BER) required for DNA maintenance, replication, recombination, and drug resistance.

The mitochondrial DNA of mammalian cells is constantly under attack from oxygen radicals released during ATP production. Mammalian cell mitochondria contain an efficient base excision repair system employing POLB that removes some frequent oxidative DNA damages. POLB thus has a key role in maintaining the stability of the mitochondrial genome.

An analysis of the fidelity of DNA replication by polymerase beta in the neurons from young and very aged mice indicated that aging has no significant effect on the fidelity of DNA synthesis by polymerase beta. This finding was considered to provide evidence against the error catastrophe theory of aging.

=== Base excision repair ===
Cabelof et al. measured the ability to repair DNA damage by the BER pathway in tissues of young (4-month-old) and old (24-month-old) mice. In all tissues examined (brain, liver, spleen and testes) the ability to repair DNA damage declined significantly with age, and the reduction in repair capability correlated with decreased levels of DNA polymerase beta at both the protein and messenger RNA levels. Numerous investigators have reported an accumulation of DNA damage with age, especially in brain and liver. Cabelof et al. suggested that the inability of the BER pathway to repair damages over time may provide a mechanistic explanation for the frequent observations of DNA accumulation of damage with age.

== Regulation of expression ==
DNA polymerase beta maintains genome integrity by participating in base excision repair. Overexpression of POLB mRNA has been correlated with a number of cancer types, whereas deficiencies in POLB results in hypersensitivity to alkylating agents, induced apoptosis, and chromosomal breaking. Therefore, it is essential that POLB expression is tightly regulated.

POLB gene is upregulated by CREB1 transcription factor's binding to the cAMP response element (CRE) present in the promoter of the POLB gene in response to exposure to alkylating agents. POLB gene expression is also regulated at the post transcriptional level as the 3'UTR of the POLB mRNA has been shown to contain three stem-loop structures that influence gene expression. These three-stem loop structures are known as M1, M2, and M3, where M2 and M3 have a key role in gene regulation. M3 contributes to gene expression, as it contains the polyadenylation signal followed by the cleavage and polyadenylation site, thereby contributing to pre-mRNA processing. M2 has been shown to be evolutionary conserved, and, through mutagenesis, it was shown that this stem loop structure acts as a RNA destabilizing element.

In addition to these cis-regulatory elements present within the 3'UTR a trans-acting protein, HAX1 is thought to contribute to the regulation of gene expression. Yeast three-hybrid assays have shown that this protein binds to the stem loops within the 3'UTR of the POLB mRNA, however the exact mechanism in how this protein regulates gene expression is still to be determined.

== Interactions ==
DNA polymerase beta has been shown to interact with PNKP and XRCC1.

== See also ==
- POLA1
- POLA2
