= XRCC1 =

Protein

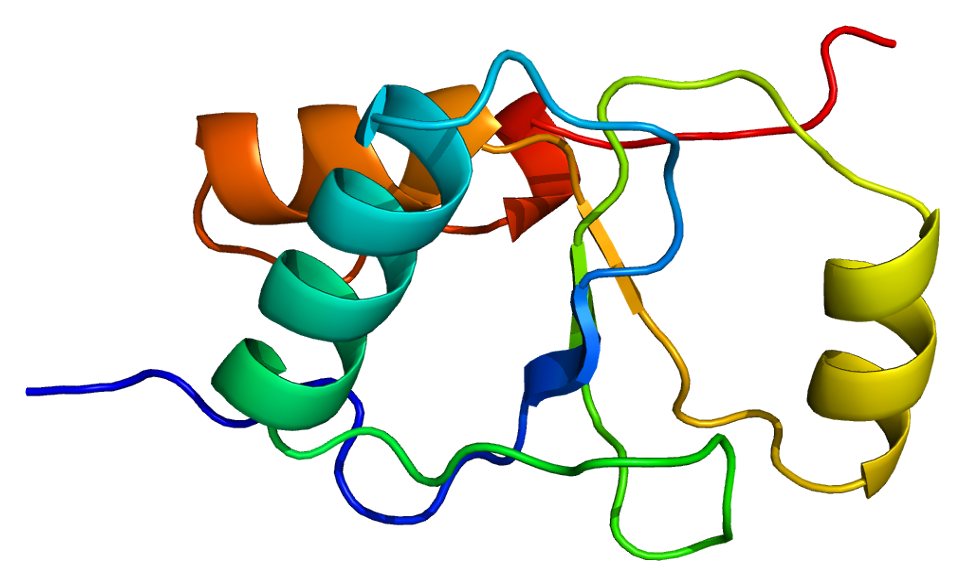

Identifiers
- Aliases: XRCC1, RCC, X-ray repair complementing defective repair in Chinese hamster cells 1, X-ray repair cross complementing 1, SCAR26
- External IDs: OMIM: 194360; MGI: 99137; GeneCards: XRCC1
Available structures
| PDB | Ortholog search: PDBe RCSB |
| PDB | List of PDB id codes 3LQC, 1CDZ, 1XNA, 1XNT, 2D8M, 2W3O, 3K75, 3K77, 5E6Q |

Gene location (Human)
| Chr. | Chromosome 19 (human) |
| Band | 19q13.31 | Start | 43,543,311 bp |
| Band | 19q13.31 | End | 43,580,473 bp |

Gene location (Mouse)
| Chr. | Chromosome 7 (mouse) |
| Band | 7 A3|7 11.42 cM | Start | 24,245,714 bp |
| Band | 7 A3|7 11.42 cM | End | 24,272,865 bp |
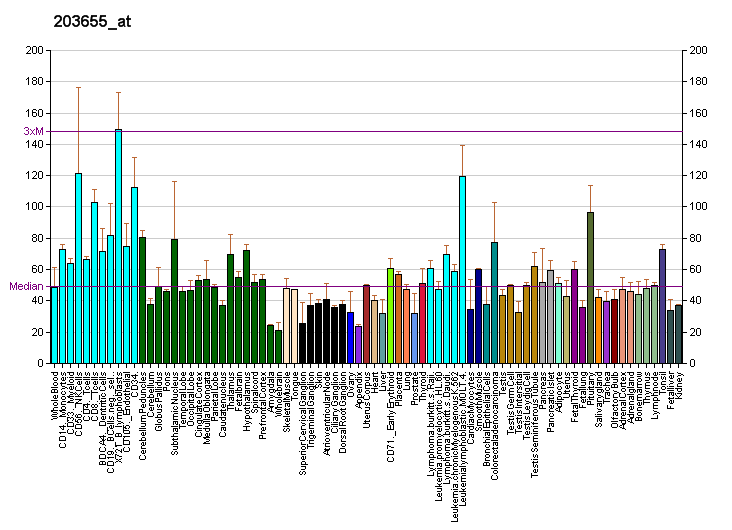
RNA expression pattern
| Bgee | Human / Mouse (ortholog); Top expressed in: ventricular zone; tendon of biceps brachii; ganglionic eminence; oocyte; pituitary gland; anterior pituitary; right uterine tube; left ovary; right ovary; granulocyte / Top expressed in: saccule; otic placode; otic vesicle; superior surface of tongue; gallbladder; internal carotid artery; ventricular zone; external carotid artery; epiblast; primary oocyte; More reference expression data |
| BioGPS | More reference expression data |
Gene ontology
| Molecular function | damaged DNA binding; enzyme binding; protein binding; DNA ligase activity; 3' overhang single-stranded DNA endodeoxyribonuclease activity; oxidized DNA binding |
| Cellular component | nucleoplasm; ERCC4-ERCC1 complex; nucleus; nucleolus |
| Biological process | single strand break repair; nucleotide-excision repair, DNA gap filling; transcription-coupled nucleotide-excision repair; response to hypoxia; response to organic substance; double-strand break repair via homologous recombination; cellular response to DNA damage stimulus; base-excision repair, DNA ligation; hippocampus development; DNA repair; double-strand break repair via nonhomologous end joining; negative regulation of protection from non-homologous end joining at telomere; telomeric DNA-containing double minutes formation; base-excision repair; negative regulation of protein ADP-ribosylation; positive regulation of DNA ligase activity; cerebellum morphogenesis; response to hydroperoxide; voluntary musculoskeletal movement; positive regulation of single strand break repair; replication-born double-strand break repair via sister chromatid exchange |
Sources:Amigo / QuickGO
Orthologs
| Databases | NCBI: entry; OMA: entry |
| Species | Human | Mouse |
| Entrez | 7515 | 22594 |
| Ensembl | ENSG00000073050 | ENSMUSG00000051768 |
| UniProt | P18887 | Q60596 |
| RefSeq (mRNA) | NM_006297 | NM_009532; NM_001360168; NM_001360169; NM_001360170 |
| RefSeq (protein) | NP_006288 | NP_033558; NP_001347097; NP_001347098; NP_001347099 |
| Location (UCSC) | Chr 19: 43.54 – 43.58 Mb | Chr 7: 24.25 – 24.27 Mb |
| PubMed search |
- Wikidata
| View/Edit Human | View/Edit Mouse |

DNA repair protein XRCC1, also known as X-ray repair cross-complementing protein 1, is a protein that in humans is encoded by the XRCC1 gene. XRCC1 is involved in DNA repair, where it complexes with DNA ligase III.

== Function ==
XRCC1_N
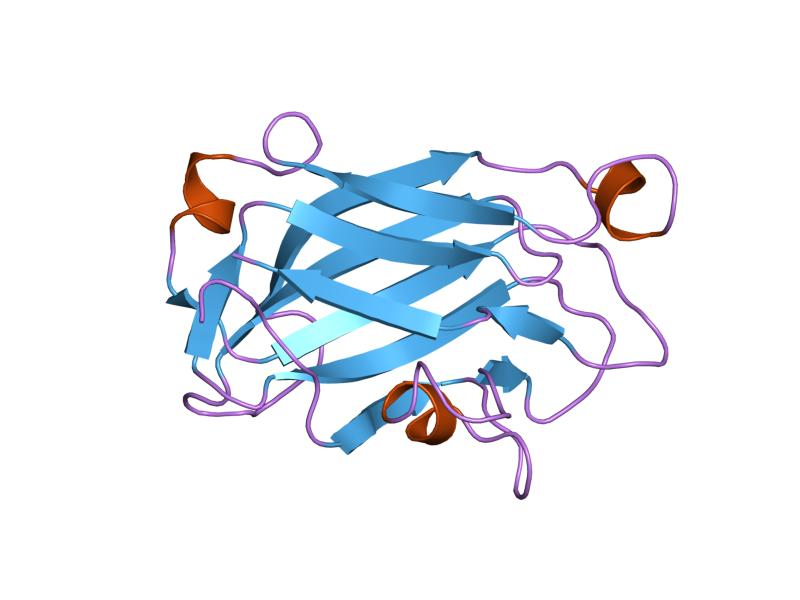
- nmr solution structure of the single-strand break repair protein xrcc1-n-terminal domain

Identifiers
- Symbol: XRCC1_N
- Pfam: PF01834
- Pfam clan: CL0202
- InterPro: IPR002706
- SCOP2: 1xnt / SCOPe / SUPFAM
Available protein structures:
- PDB: IPR002706 PF01834 (ECOD; PDBsum)
- AlphaFold: IPR002706; PF01834

XRCC1 is involved in the efficient repair of DNA single-strand breaks formed by exposure to ionizing radiation and alkylating agents. This protein interacts with DNA ligase III, polymerase beta and poly (ADP-ribose) polymerase to participate in the base excision repair pathway. It may play a role in DNA processing during meiogenesis, i.e. during the induction of meiosis and recombination in germ cells. A rare microsatellite polymorphism in this gene is associated with cancer in patients of varying radiosensitivity.

The XRCC1 protein does not have enzymatic activity, but acts as a scaffolding protein that interacts with multiple repair enzymes. The scaffolding allows these repair enzymes to then carry out their enzymatic steps in repairing DNA. XRCC1 is involved in single-strand break repair, base excision repair and nucleotide excision repair.

As reviewed by London, XRCC1 protein has three globular domains connected by two linker segments of ~150 and 120 residues. The XRCC1 N-terminal domain binds to DNA polymerase beta, the C-terminal BRCT domain interacts with DNA ligase III alpha and the central domain contains a poly(ADP-ribose) binding motif. This central domain allows recruitment of XRCC1 to polymeric ADP-ribose that forms on PARP1 after PARP1 binds to single strand breaks. The first linker contains a nuclear localization sequence and also has a region that interacts with DNA repair protein REV1, and REV1 recruits translesion polymerases. The second linker interacts with polynucleotide kinase phosphatase ( PNKP) (that processes DNA broken ends during base excision repair), aprataxin (active in single-strand DNA repair and non-homologous end joining) and a third protein designated aprataxin- and PNKP-like factor.

XRCC1 has an essential role in microhomology-mediated end joining (MMEJ) repair of double strand breaks. MMEJ is a highly error-prone DNA repair pathway that results in deletion mutations. XRCC1 is one of 6 proteins required for this pathway.

== Over-expression in cancer ==
XRCC1 is over-expressed in non-small-cell lung carcinoma (NSCLC), and at an even higher level in metastatic lymph nodes of NSCLC.

== Under-expression in cancer ==
Deficiency in XRCC1, due to being heterozygous for a mutated XRCC1 gene coding for a truncated XRCC1 protein, suppresses tumor growth in mice. Under three experimental conditions for inducing three types of cancer (colon cancer, melanoma or breast cancer), mice heterozygous for this XRCC1 mutation had substantially lower tumor volume or number than wild type mice undergoing the same carcinogenic treatments.

== Comparison with other DNA repair genes in cancer ==
Cancers are very often deficient in expression of one or more DNA repair genes, but over-expression of a DNA repair gene is less usual in cancer. For instance, at least 36 DNA repair proteins, when mutationally defective in germ line cells, cause increased risk of cancer (hereditary cancer syndromes). (Also see DNA repair-deficiency disorder.) Similarly, at least 12 DNA repair genes have frequently been found to be epigenetically repressed in one or more cancers. (See also Epigenetically reduced DNA repair and cancer.) Ordinarily, deficient expression of a DNA repair enzyme results in increased un-repaired DNA damages which, through replication errors (translesion synthesis), lead to mutations and cancer. However, XRCC1 mediated MMEJ repair is directly mutagenic, so in this case, over-expression, rather than under-expression, apparently leads to cancer. Reduction of mutagenic XRCC1 mediated MMEJ repair leads to reduced progression of cancer.

== Aging ==
In aged human adipose-derived stem cells, base excision repair (BER), but not DNA double-strand break repair, is impaired. The XRCC1 protein, but not other BER factors, showed an age-associated decline. Overexpression of XRCC1 reversed the age-associated decline of BER function.

== Stroke recovery ==
Oxidative stress is increased in the brain during ischemic stroke leading to an increased burden on stress resistance mechanisms, including those for repairing oxidatively damaged DNA. Consequently any loss of a repair system that would ordinarily restore damaged DNA may impede survival and normal function of brain neurons. Ghosh et al. reported that partial loss of XRCC1 function causes increased DNA damage in the brain and reduced recovery from ischemic stroke. This finding indicates that XRCC1-mediated base excision repair is important for speedy recovery from stroke.

== Structure ==
The NMR solution structure of the Xrcc1 N-terminal domain (Xrcc1 NTD) shows that the structural core is a beta-sandwich with beta-strands connected by loops, three helices and two short two-stranded beta-sheets at each connection side. The Xrcc1 NTD specifically binds single-strand break DNA (gapped and nicked) and a gapped DNA-beta-Pol complex.

== Interactions ==
XRCC1 has been shown to interact with:

- APEX1,
- APTX,
- OGG1,
- PARP2,
- PCNA,
- PNKP,
- POLB, and
- PARP1.
