= DNA-3-methyladenine glycosylase II =

Identifiers
- EC no.: 3.2.2.21
- CAS no.: 89287-38-7

Databases
- IntEnz: IntEnz view
- BRENDA: BRENDA entry
- ExPASy: NiceZyme view
- KEGG: KEGG entry
- MetaCyc: metabolic pathway
- PRIAM: profile
- PDB structures: RCSB PDB PDBe PDBsum
Search
- PMC: articles
- PubMed: articles
- NCBI: proteins

DNA-3-methyladenine glycosylase II (EC 3.2.2.21) is an enzyme that catalyses the following chemical reaction:

Hydrolysis of alkylated DNA, releasing 3-methyladenine, 3-methylguanine, 7-methylguanine, and 7-methyladenine

Involved in the removal of alkylated bases from DNA in Escherichia coli.

== Evolution ==
Through the process of convergent evolution, there are at least two unrelated protein folds that share the same DNA-3-methyladenine glycosylase activity. The first, the AlkA N-terminal domain, is found in bacteria Pfam PF06029. The second, methylpurine-DNA glycosylase (MPG) Pfam PF02245 is found in vertebrates including humans.

== Nomenclature ==
DNA-3-methyladenine glycosylase II is also known as

- deoxyribonucleate 3-methyladenine glycosides II
- 3-methyladenine DNA glycosylase II
- DNA-3-methyladenine glycosides II
- AlkA
- alkylated-DNA glycohydrolase (releasing methyladenine and methylguanine)

== See also ==
- MAG1 (DNA-3-methyladenine glycosylase)
