= AlkD =

Enzyme

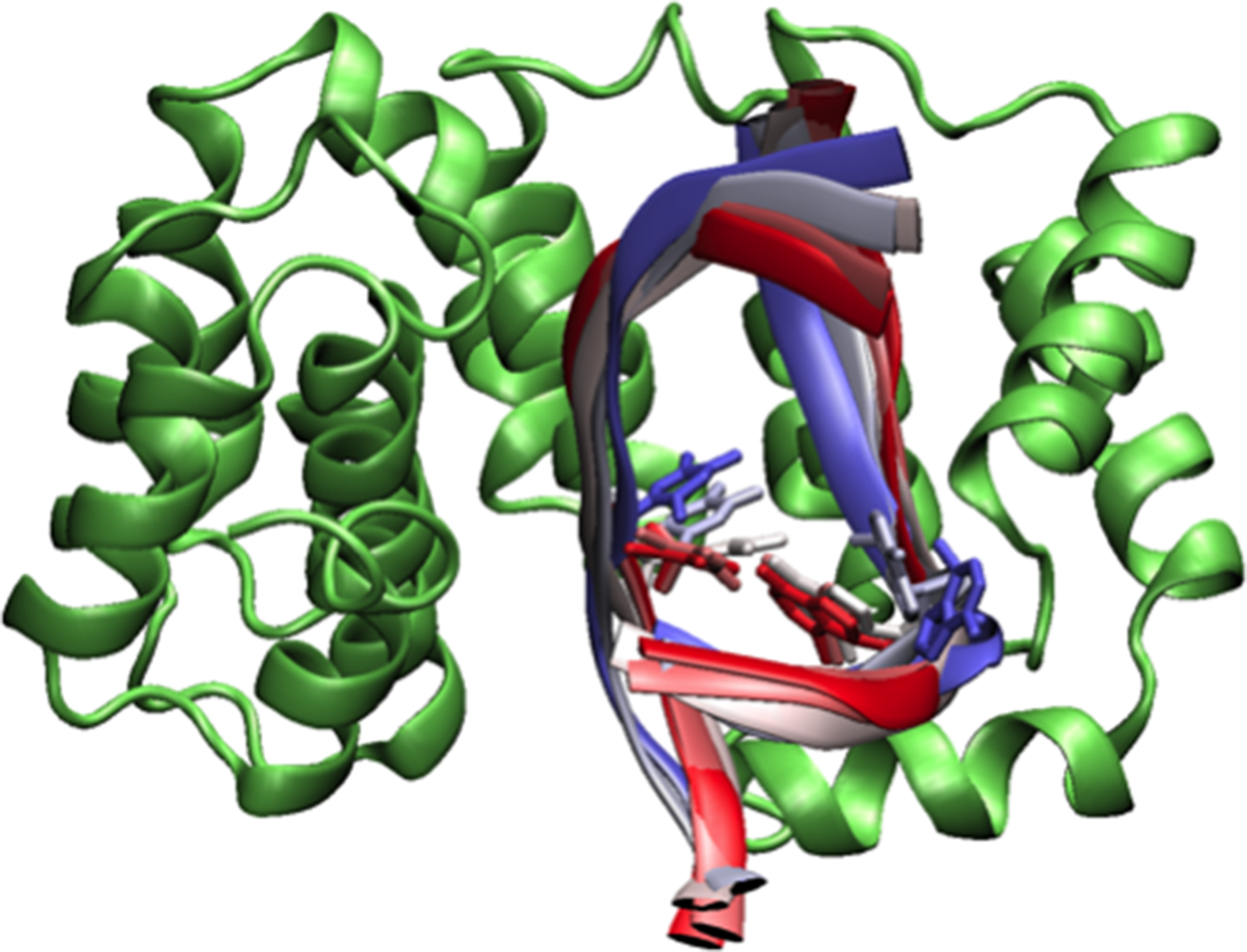
AlkD is shown in green. DNA strand is indicated by red and blue.

AlkD (Alkylpurine glycosylase D) is an enzyme belonging to a family of DNA glycosylases that are involved in DNA repair. It was discovered by a team of Norwegian biologists from Oslo in 2006. It was isolated from a soil-dwelling Gram-positive bacteria Bacillus cereus, along with another enzyme AlkC. AlkC and AlkD are most probably derived from the same protein as indicated by their close resemblance. They are also found in other prokaryotes. Among eukaryotes, they are found only in the single-celled species only, such as Entamoeba histolytica and Dictyostelium discoideum. The enzyme specifically targets 7mG (methyl-guanine) in the DNA, and is, therefore, unique among DNA glycosylases. It can also act on other methylpurines with less affinity. It indicates that the enzyme is specific for locating and cutting (excision) of chemically modified bases from DNA, exactly at 7mG, whenever there are errors in replication. It accelerates the rate of 7mG hydrolysis 100-fold over the spontaneous depurination. Thus, it protects the genome from harmful changes induced by chemical and environmental agents. Its crystal structure was described in 2008. It is the first HEAT repeat protein identified to interact with nucleic acids or to contain enzymatic activity.

== Structure ==
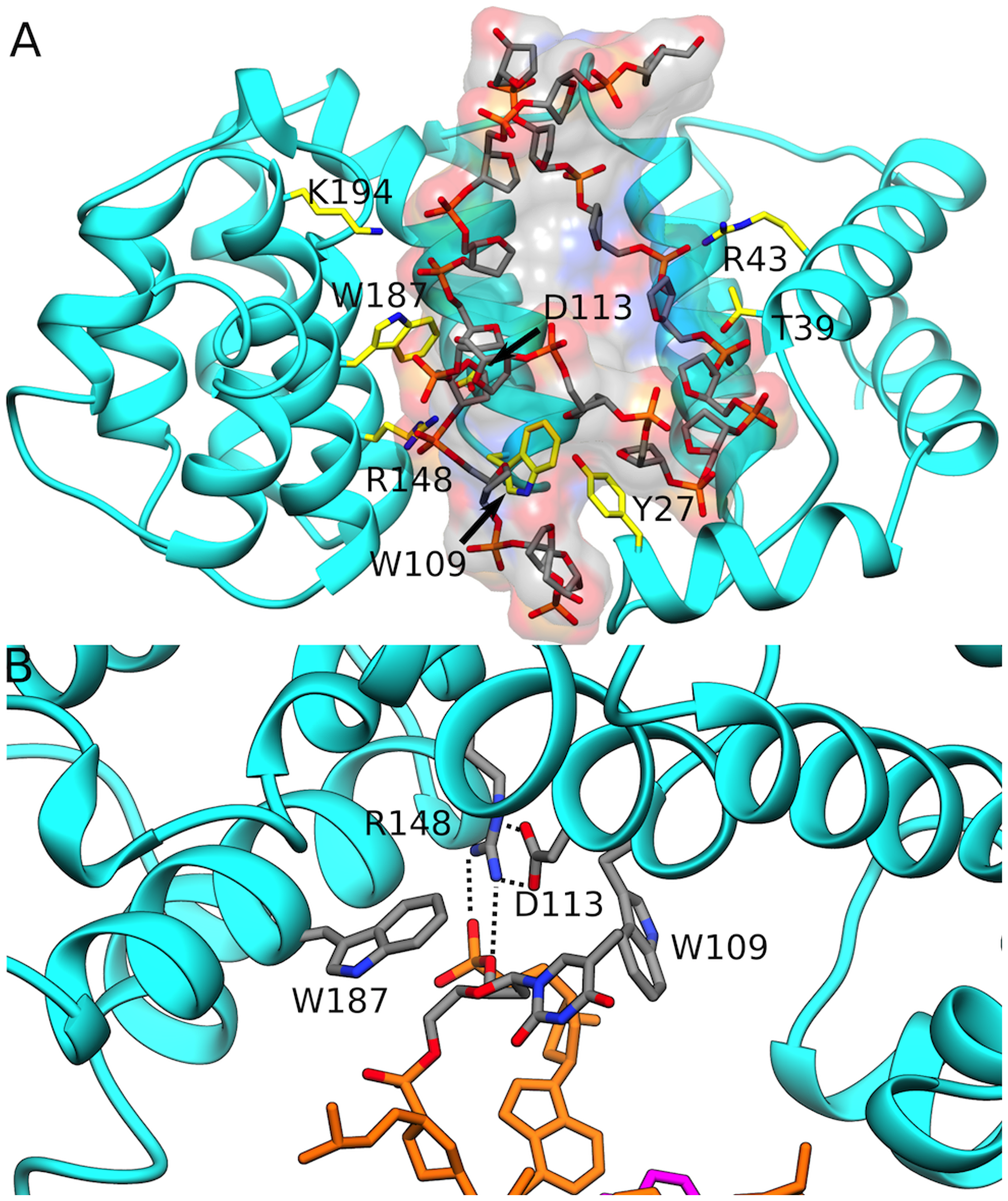
AlkD (green) recognizes DNA (multi-coloured) through HEAT repeat motifs.

AlkD is made up of 237 amino acids, and has a molecular size of 25 kDa. It is composed of a tandem array of helical repeats reminiscent of HEAT motifs, which are known to facilitate protein-protein interactions and have not yet been associated with DNA binding or catalytic activity. It is a single-stranded protein with α-helical domain. The entire protein domain is composed of HEAT repeat domains, similar to those found in other proteins. Twelve of the fourteen helices (αA-αN) pair in an antiparallel pattern, and form six tandemly repeated α-α motifs, such as αA/αC, αD/αE, αF/αG, αH/αI, αJ/αK, and αL/αM. These helical repeats are stacked into a superhelical solenoid in which helices B, C, E, G, I, K and M form a concave surface with an aromatic cleft at its center. Residues within this cleft are crucial for the base excision activity. The concave surface is positively charged and is presumed to be the binding site of DNA, as well as for protection against bacterial sensitivity to alkylating agents.

== Mechanism of action ==
AlkD has a unique mechanism for base excision in DNA. Instead of interacting directly with the damaged (alkylated) DNA portion, it acts on the nearby undamaged region. It then induces flipping of the alkylated and opposing base accompanied by DNA stack compression. The exposed DNA portion can then be enzymatically removed, by hydrolysis of the 7mG.
