= MAG1 =

3-methyl-adenine DNA glycosylase [Saccharomyces cerevisiae]

Identifiers
- Symbol: MAG1
- NCBI gene: 856885
- UniProt: P22134

Other data
- EC number: 3.2.2.21
Search for
- Structures: Swiss-model
- Domains: InterPro

MAG1 is a gene in the yeast Saccharomyces cerevisiae that encodes DNA-3-methyladenine glycosylase, a monofunctional DNA N-glycosylase involved in base excision repair. It initiates repair of alkylation damage and helps protect yeast cells from methylating agents.

== Function ==
MAG1 transcription is induced when yeast cells are exposed to relatively non-toxic levels of alkylating agents. The encoded glycosylase has been reported to excise 3-methyladenine, 7-methylguanine, hypoxanthine, and 1,N6-ethenoadenine from DNA.
