= Thymine glycol =

Names
- IUPAC name 5,6-Dihydroxy-5-methyldihydro-2,4(1H,3H)-pyrimidinedione
- Other names 5,6-Dihydroxy-5,6-dihydrothymine

Identifiers
CAS Number	2943-56-8
3D model (JSmol)	Interactive image
ChEBI	CHEBI:29128
ChemSpider	17061
PubChem CID	18058
CompTox Dashboard (EPA)	DTXSID601317323
- InChI: InChI=1S/C5H8N2O4/c1-5(11)2(8)6-4(10)7-3(5)9/h2,8,11H,1H3,(H2,6,7,9,10) Key: GUKSGXOLJNWRLZ-UHFFFAOYSA-N
- SMILES: CC1(C(NC(=O)NC1=O)O)O

Properties
Chemical formula	C_{5}H_{8}N_{2}O_{4}
Molar mass	160.129 g·mol^{−1}
- Except where otherwise noted, data are given for materials in their standard state (at 25 °C [77 °F], 100 kPa). Infobox references

Thymine glycol (5,6-dihydroxy-5,6-dihydrothymine) is one of the principal DNA lesions that can be induced by oxidation and ionizing radiation. Its name indicates its major structural nature: a glycol derivative of thymine, as the apparent 1,2-dihydroxylation of its alkene region.

== Aging, stroke ==
The rate at which oxidative reactions generate thymine glycol and thymidine glycol in the DNA of humans is estimated to be about 300 per cell per day. Oxidized DNA bases that are excised by DNA repair processes are excreted in urine. On a body weight basis, mice excrete 18 times more thymine glycol plus thymidine glycol than humans, and monkeys four times more than humans. It was proposed that rate of occurrence of oxidative DNA damage correlates with metabolic rate, and that a higher rate of oxidative damage might cause a higher rate of cellular aging.

Base excision repair is a major DNA repair pathway for removal of oxidative DNA damages. The rate of repair of thymine glycol damage in human fibroblasts was found to decrease with age. Brain samples from humans who died of stroke were found to be deficient in base excision repair of thymine glycol as well as other types of oxidative damages. It was suggested that impaired base excision repair is a risk factor for ischemic brain injury.
