= PNKP =

Protein-coding gene in the species Homo sapiens

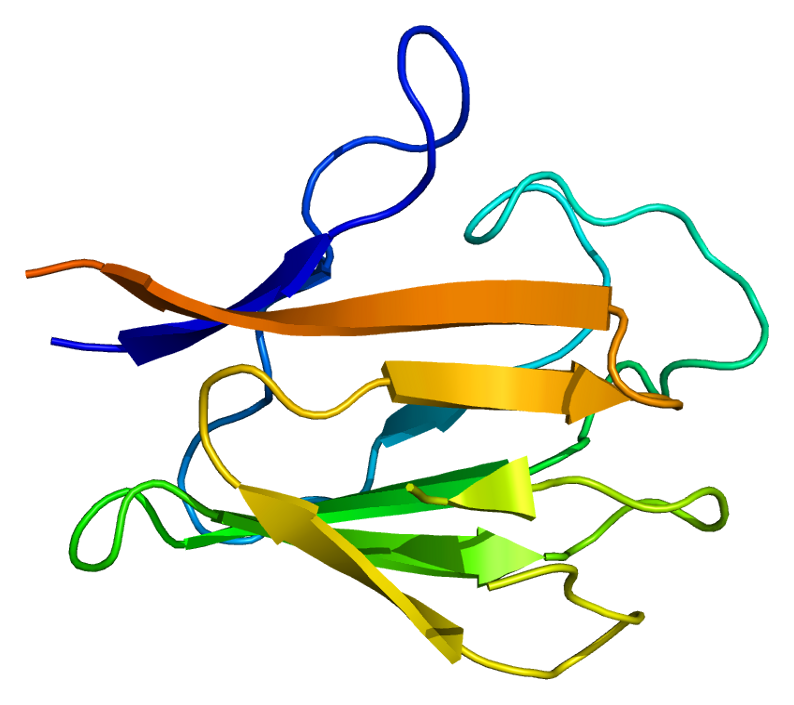

Identifiers
- Aliases: PNKP, EIEE10, MCSZ, PNK, AOA4, polynucleotide kinase 3'-phosphatase, CMT2B2
- External IDs: OMIM: 605610; MGI: 1891698; GeneCards: PNKP
Available structures
PDB	Ortholog search: PDBe RCSB
PDB	List of PDB id codes 2BRF, 2W3O
Enzyme activity
EC #	BRENDA	ExPASy	KEGG	MetaCyc
2.7.1.78	↗	↗	↗	↗
3.1.3.32	↗	↗	↗	↗

Gene location (Human)
Chr.	Chromosome 19 (human)
Band	19q13.33	Start	49,859,882 bp
Band	19q13.33	End	49,878,351 bp

Gene location (Mouse)
Chr.	Chromosome 7 (mouse)
Band	7|7 B3	Start	44,506,563 bp
Band	7|7 B3	End	44,512,416 bp
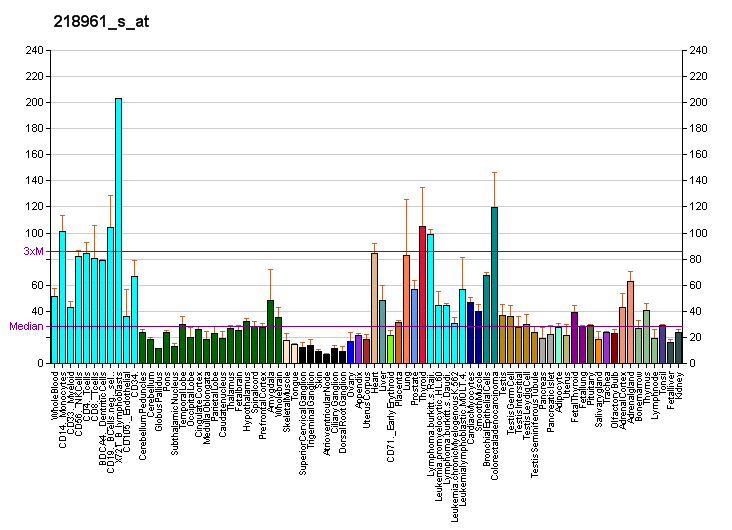
RNA expression pattern
Bgee	Human / Mouse (ortholog); Top expressed in: right uterine tube; granulocyte; right adrenal cortex; anterior pituitary; right lobe of thyroid gland; left adrenal gland; left adrenal cortex; left lobe of thyroid gland; right ovary; apex of heart / Top expressed in: granulocyte; spermatocyte; muscle of thigh; ventricular zone; bone marrow; right kidney; thymus; lip; yolk sac; superior frontal gyrus; More reference expression data
BioGPS	More reference expression data
Gene ontology
Molecular function	transferase activity; nucleotide binding; polydeoxyribonucleotide 5'-hydroxyl-kinase activity; kinase activity; damaged DNA binding; protein binding; catalytic activity; purine nucleotide binding; endonuclease activity; double-stranded DNA binding; hydrolase activity; ATP binding; polynucleotide 3'-phosphatase activity; nucleoside monophosphate kinase activity; polynucleotide kinase activity
Cellular component	membrane; nucleoplasm; nucleolus; nucleus; mitochondrion
Biological process	DNA-dependent DNA replication; nucleotide-excision repair, DNA damage removal; positive regulation of telomere capping; phosphorylation; positive regulation of telomere maintenance via telomerase; response to oxidative stress; cellular response to DNA damage stimulus; nucleotide phosphorylation; positive regulation of telomerase activity; response to radiation; metabolism; dephosphorylation; polynucleotide 3' dephosphorylation; DNA repair; nucleic acid phosphodiester bond hydrolysis; negative regulation of protein ADP-ribosylation; nucleoside monophosphate phosphorylation
Sources:Amigo / QuickGO
Orthologs
Databases	NCBI: entry; OMA: entry
Species	Human	Mouse
Entrez	11284	59047
Ensembl	ENSG00000039650	ENSMUSG00000002963
UniProt	Q96T60	Q9JLV6
RefSeq (mRNA)	NM_007254	NM_001290764; NM_001290766; NM_001290767; NM_021549
RefSeq (protein)	NP_009185	n/a
Location (UCSC)	Chr 19: 49.86 – 49.88 Mb	Chr 7: 44.51 – 44.51 Mb
PubMed search
- Wikidata
View/Edit Human	View/Edit Mouse

Bifunctional polynucleotide phosphatase/kinase is an enzyme that in humans is encoded by the PNKP gene. A detailed structural study of the crystallized mouse protein examined both the 5´-polynucleotide kinase and 3’-polynucleotide phosphatase activities. Additional features of the peptide sequence include a forkhead association (FHA) domain, ATP binding site and nuclear and mitochondrial localization sequences.

== Interactions ==
PNKP has been shown to interact with DNA polymerase beta and XRCC1.

== Role in neurologic disease ==
The human gene encoding PNKP was observed to be mutated in patients with microcephaly, seizures and defects in DNA repair. A type of recessive ataxia is also associated with PNKP mutations. There are also newly characterized pathological variants of PNKP. Model organisms such as mice and Drosophila have been used to generate further insights.
