= Host-cell reactivation =

The term host cell reactivation or HCR was first used to describe the survival of UV-irradiated bacteriophages, that were transfected to UV-pretreated cells. This phenomenon was first thought to be the result of homologous recombination between both bacteria and phage, but later recognized as enzymatic repair. Modifications of the assay were later developed, using transient expression plasmid DNA vectors on immortalized fibroblasts, and lately on human lymphocytes.

The HCR assay known also as plasmid reactivation assay, indirectly monitors cellular transcriptional repair system, that is activated by the transcriptional-inhibited damage inflicted by UV-Radiation into the plasmid. Given that UV-induced DNA damage is used as mutagen, the cell uses nucleotide excision repair NER pathway, that is activated by distortion in the DNA helix.

The Host-Cell Reactivation Assay or HCR is a technique used to measure the DNA repair capacity of cell of a particular DNA alteration. In the HCR assay the ability of an intact cell to repair exogenous DNA is measured The host cell is transfected with a damaged plasmid containing a reporter gene, usually luciferase, which has been deactivated due to the damage. The ability of the cell to repair the damage in the plasmid, after it has been introduced to the cell, allows the reporter gene to be reactivated. Earlier versions of this assay were based on the chloramphenicol acetyltransferase (CAT) gene, but the version of the assay using luciferase as reporter gene is as much as 100-fold more sensitive.

== See also ==
- Accelerated aging disease
- Aging DNA
- Cell cycle
- DNA damage (naturally occurring)
- DNA damage theory of aging
- DNA replication
- Direct DNA damage
- Human mitochondrial genetics
- Indirect DNA damage
- Progeria
