= DNA-3-methyladenine glycosylase I =

Identifiers
- EC no.: 3.2.2.20
- CAS no.: 89287-37-6

Databases
- IntEnz: IntEnz view
- BRENDA: BRENDA entry
- ExPASy: NiceZyme view
- KEGG: KEGG entry
- MetaCyc: metabolic pathway
- PRIAM: profile
- PDB structures: RCSB PDB PDBe PDBsum
Search
- PMC: articles
- PubMed: articles
- NCBI: proteins

DNA-3-methyladenine glycosylase I (EC 3.2.2.20, deoxyribonucleate 3-methyladenine glycosidase I, 3-methyladenine DNA glycosylase I, DNA-3-methyladenine glycosidase I) is an enzyme with systematic name alkylated-DNA glycohydrolase (releasing methyladenine and methylguanine). This enzyme catalyses the following chemical reaction

Hydrolysis of alkylated DNA, releasing 3-methyladenine

This enzyme is involved in the removal of alkylated bases from DNA in Escherichia coli.
