= Tandem gait =

Component of the neurological exam

Tandem gait is a component of certain neurological examinations and is most commonly used to assess cerebellar ataxia. The test dates back to the early nineteenth century. During the examination, patients walk in a straight line in heel-to-toe formation without support and whilst looking upwards. The test consists of at least ten steps. If a patient makes two or more missteps sideways across multiple trials of the test, they are considered to have an abnormal tandem gait. An abnormal tandem gait is most commonly a symptom of a cerebellar disease, but can also be observed in those with Huntington's disease, essential tremors, atypical parkinsonism, peripheral neuropathies, and vestibulopathies. A person with an abnormal tandem gait does not necessarily have ataxia, as there can be additional causes such as muscle weakness or visual impairments.

== Definition ==
Tandem gait is a component of the neurologic examination used to assess an individual's overall balance. In order to perform the tandem gait test, the patient walks in a straight line with their eyes open, placing the heel of the leading foot directly in front of the toes of the following foot so that the heel and toes touch, while keeping their arms at their side. This walk test is performed without any support. In order to supplement sufficient data for the physical examination, one must walk at least ten consecutive steps maintaining such form. This can be performed on any surface.

In addition to medical diagnostic applications, tandem gait is used by police as a field sobriety test to detect impairment by alcohol or other drugs.

== History ==
Although explicit testing of the tandem gait as part of the neurological exam was not performed until the late 20th century, there are mentions of impaired balance and gait abnormalities secondary to cerebellar lesions in the medical literature as early as the 19th century.

Margolesky et al. (2018) note that the first study that described impaired balance after cerebellar lesion was Luigi Rolando's Saggio sopra la vera struttura del cervello dell’uomo e degli animali e sopra le funzioni del sistema nervoso completed in 1809. The study found that after the medial lobe of the cerebellum in goats was partially resected, they had difficulty walking straight, swaying side-to-side and causing an increased number of falls. In 1824, Marie Jean-Pierre Flourens's Recherches experimentales sur les proprieties et les fonctions du systeme nerveux dans les animaux vertebres also found a similar gait disturbance in guinea pigs and dogs after cerebellar lesions.

Additional studies performed by William Alexander Hammond and William Richard Gowers observed staggering or "drunken" gait in humans, noting the particular involvement of the middle cerebellar lobe and vermis in A Treatise on the Diseases of the Nervous System (1871) and A Manual of Diseases of the Nervous System (1888). In 1898, Charles Karsner Mills also mentioned lesions of the anterior and caudal cerebellar vermis in humans causing loss of balance with increased forward and backward falls, respectively, in The Nervous System and Its Diseases.

In the early 20th century, as understanding of the nervous system and its pathologies increased, medical literature was published supporting the observation of abnormal tandem gait secondary to cerebellar vermal lesions. Examples of such literature include Nervous and Mental Diseases (1911) by Church and Peterson and Diseases of the Nervous System: A Textbook of Neurology and Psychiatry (1929) by Jelliffe and White.

In 1998, Bastian et al. understood that each region of the cerebellum contributes to balance and posture in different ways, and that therefore a lesion in each region results in a specific balance impairment. They described the posterior vermal split syndrome in which the surgical resection of the posterior vermis in five children caused isolated impaired tandem gait. Patients were seen to be significantly swaying while attempting to tandem walk with frequent falls. In these same patients, there was minimal impact on Romberg stance, self-paced gait, one-legged stance, hopping, pinching, reaching, and kicking.

== Pathologies of an abnormal tandem gait ==
Two or more steps sideways out of the straight line that can be reproduced at least twice while walking heel-to-toe are considered an abnormal tandem gait. This most commonly signifies cerebellar disease but can also be seen in Huntington's disease, essential tremor, atypical parkinsonism, peripheral neuropathies, and vestibulopathies.

=== Cerebellar disease ===
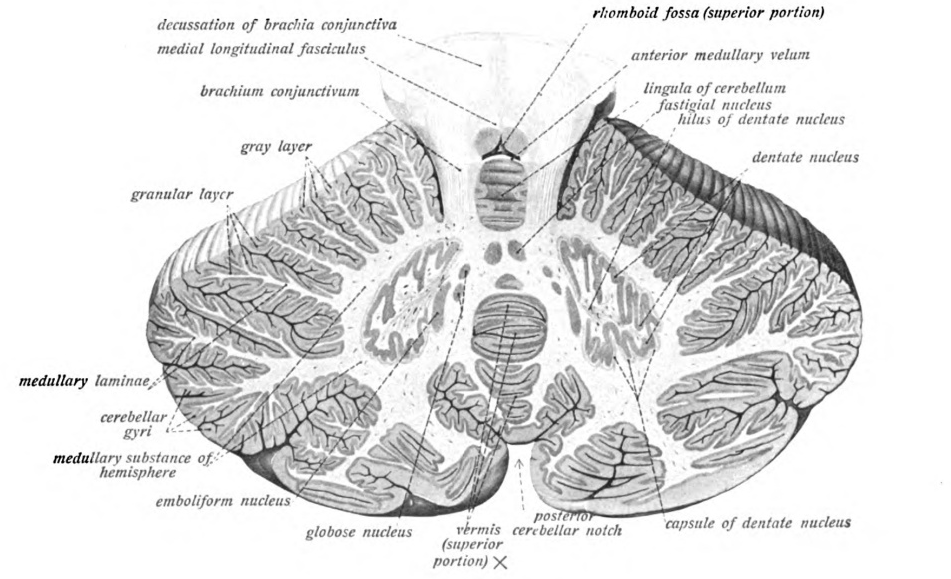
Cross-section of the cerebellum. The vermis is located in the middle lobe.

The cerebellum is responsible for coordinated movements. The medial cerebellum is thought to have control over coordination of the body's truncal and limb girdle muscle movements specifically. Dysfunction or disease of the cerebellum causes ataxia. Disruption of gait, balance, or posture is commonly seen in cerebellar disease along with dysmetria, dysdiadochokinesia, speech changes, tremor, nystagmus, etc. Tandem walk is a test that can be used by physicians to test cerebellar control of gait/balance/posture. Those with disease of the middle cerebellum or vermis are likely to show an impaired tandem walk as well.

Physicians use the term "ataxic gait" to describe those who have uncoordinated walking and difficulties with balance. The Scale for the assessment and rating for ataxia (SARA) is a tool to evaluate patients for signs of ataxia. It includes the tandem walk test asking patients to walk without support for at least 10 steps with heel-to-toe, forgiving only one misstep.

=== Idiopathic Parkinson's disease and atypical parkinsonism ===
Neurologists can use tandem walk test to distinguish idiopathic Parkinson's disease (PD) from atypical parkinsonism. Abnormal tandem gait manifests earlier in atypical parkinsonism than PD. Tandem gait seems to be less likely affected in early PD compared to atypical parkinsonism. In late stage PD, lesions begin to manifest beyond the nigrostriatal pathway affecting the cerebellum, brainstem, and more, impacting the body's mediolateral balance centers. Paired with the additional PD-related cerebrovascular risk factors, late-stage-PD patients seem to become more and more difficulty with tandem walking shown through increasingly wider-based stance and step-to-step variability. Margolesky et al. (2019) suggest that failure of tandem gait may correlate with the increased risk of falls in PD patients as well. Thus, tandem gait may be used as a tool to predict fall-risk in PD patients.

=== Huntington's disease (HD) ===
Similar to PD and atypical parkinsonism, along with degeneration of the striatum, cortex, and white matter tracts, the cerebellum can be affected in advanced Huntington's disease impacting balance and gait. Although hyperkinetic choreiform movements are the hallmark of the disease, progressive slowing of movements, shorter strides, and increased variability of gait including presence of ataxia can be seen in HD as well. In some HD patients, detriments to gait and posture may be seen in early stages. Talman and Hiller (2021) highlight the role of cognitive decline as well as motor manifestations of the disease impacting gait performance. They note worsened gait and posture in HD patients when engaged in an attention-seeking task (such as walking while holding a tray) due to decreased ability to cognitively adapt to multitasking.

The Unified Huntington's Disease Rating Scale (UHDRS) is a tool used to evaluate patients with HD. It assigns motor, cognitive, behavioral, somatic, total functional capacity, functional assessment, and independence scores. Tandem gait is tested under motor on a scale of 0 to 4.

=== Essential tremor ===
Patients with essential tremor often have difficulties with balance and coordinated walking as well. In a study done by Louis et al. (2010), there was a correlation found between cranial essential tremor patients and abnormal tandem gait, suggesting neck, voice, and jaw intention tremors may also derive from shared pathology of the mid-cerebellum.

=== Peripheral neuropathies and vestibulopathies ===
Peripheral neuropathies, particularly in the feet, cause loss of sensation, disrupting the body's ability to balance itself. With a disruption in ability to sense where and how the feet are standing (proprioception), more prominent with eyes closed, tandem walking can be profoundly impaired in those with peripheral neuropathies. In their study, Ullah and Rizwan (2025) found impaired tandem stance in diabetic peripheral neuropathy patients, particularly when eyes were closed due to a dampened sense of proprioception, demonstrating impaired overall sense of balance.

The vestibular system also plays a role in balance because it receives and utilizes input from head accelerations converting it into a message to our brain informing where the body stands in space. Patients with vestibulopathies, particularly involving the peripheral vestibular system, can have an abnormal tandem gait as well. Boutabla et al. (2025) found that the tandem gait test was significantly impacted in patients with bilateral vestibulopathy, demonstrating the test's usefulness in discriminating balance impairments in those with severe vestibular deficits.

For a more sensitive test, it has been recommended to perform the tandem gait test with eyes closed in both of these patient populations.

However, loss of balance and gait difficulty in patients with peripheral neuropathies and vestibulopathies is most likely multifactorial, incorporating pathologies of systems such as vascular, autoimmune, and endocrine.

== Limitations ==
Failure to perform tandem gait does not prove the presence of ataxia. There are many non-neurologic conditions that can cause unsteady gait such as vision difficulties, lower extremities or hip girdle muscle weakness, functional gait disorder, osteoarthritis of hip/knee. These factors should be taken into consideration when evaluating a patient with abnormal gait.

Although the tandem gait is a reliable test proving high test-retest reliability in healthy children and adolescent athletes, this may not be the case in older adults. Margolesky et al. (2018) also note that ability to perform tandem gait also decreases with age. Thus, performing this test in older adults may not be as reliable in supporting or rejecting the presence of ataxia.

== Next steps ==
In patients who are found to have an abnormal tandem gait, the test should first be repeated to ensure the patient reproduces the same results at least two times. Next, diagnostic tests including brain imaging (CT, MRI, etc.), more comprehensive neurologic and musculoskeletal physical exam, and a formal ataxia evaluation (SARA) should be performed to rule out cerebellar ataxia, the most common cause. If cerebellar origin of disease has been ruled out, physicians may consider performing additional tests such as genetic testing, nerve testing, or lab testing to rule out other pathologies.

Treatment of tandem gait is linked to the underlying cause. Management of the underlying disease pathology will help manage the gait, balance, or stance of patients as well.
