= Spatial anxiety =

Spatial anxiety (sometimes also referred to as spatial orientation discomfort) is a sense of anxiety an individual experiences while processing environmental information contained in one's geographical space (in the sense of Montello's classification of space), with the purpose of navigation and orientation through that space (usually unfamiliar, or very little known). Spatial anxiety is also linked to the feeling of stress regarding the anticipation of a spatial-content related performance task (such as mental rotation, spatial perception, spatial visualisation, object location memory, dynamic spatial ability). Particular cases of spatial anxiety can result in a more severe form of distress, as in agoraphobia.

== Classification ==
It is still investigated whether spatial anxiety would be considered as one solid, concrete ("unitary") construct (including the experiences of anxiety due to any spatial task), or whether it could be considered to be a "multifactorial construct" (including various subcomponents), attributing the experience of anxiety to several aspects. A 2017 research paper concluded that spatial anxiety seems to be a "multifactorial construct" that entails two components; that of anxiety regarding navigation and that of anxiety regarding the demand of rotation and visualization skills.

== Gender and further individual differences ==
Gender differences appear to be one of the most prominent differences in spatial anxiety as well as in navigational strategies. Evidence show higher levels of spatial anxiety in women, who tend to choose route strategies, as opposed to men, who tend to choose orientation strategies (a fact which, in turn, has been found to be negatively related to spatial anxiety).

Spatial anxiety levels also seem to vary across different age groups. Evidence has shown spatial anxiety to appear also, early on, during the elementary school years, with anxiety varying in level and tending to be stable; with minimum fluctuations, across life span.

== Measuring instruments ==
There are two primary ways of measuring spatial anxiety. One of them is Lawton's Spatial Anxiety Scale, which was dominant during its era of creation. The other is the Child Spatial Anxiety Questionnaire, which was first one to assess spatial anxiety levels related to other spatial abilities other than navigation and map reading.

=== Lawton's Spatial Anxiety Scale ===
The scale measures the degree of anxiety regarding the individual's experience and performance, in tasks assessing one's information processing related to the environment; such as way-finding and navigation.

In total there are eight statements. Some examples are "leaving a store that you have been to for the first time and deciding which way to turn to get to a destination" and "finding your way around in an unfamiliar mall". The rating takes place on a 5-point scale, expressing the degree of anxiety with a continuum from "not at all" to "very much".

=== Child Spatial Anxiety Questionnaire ===
The Child Spatial Anxiety Questionnaire was designed for young children and attempts to assess anxiety related to a wider (than usually) range of spatial abilities. Children are asked to report the level of anxiety they feel while in particular spatial abilities-demanding situations. In total it includes eight situations. Some examples are: "how do you feel being asked to say which direction is right or left?", "how do you feel when you are asked to point to a certain place on a map, like this one?", "how do you feel when you have to solve a maze like this in one minute?".

In the original version, the rating takes place on a 3-point scale which includes three different faces; each facial expression, representing a different emotional state (getting from "calm", to "somewhat nervous", to "very nervous"). The revised version assessment takes place on a 5-point scale, with two more facial expressions added.

== Cognitive maps in individuals with spatial anxiety ==
Self-reported spatial anxiety is negatively correlated with performance in spatial tasks, both small-scale – as assessing mental rotation, spatial visualization; and large scale – as environment learning, with participants scoring higher in spatial anxiety scale showing lowered performance. Spatial anxiety is also negatively correlated navigation proficiency ratings on the self-reported sense of direction measures, as well as orientation (map based) and route (egocentric) strategies. Additionally, as anxiety has been shown to influence performance on tasks that utilize working memory resources, working memory is bound to be affected by spatial anxiety, especially visuo-spatial working memory.

There has been evidence demonstrating the negative relationship between spatial anxiety and environmental learning ability. For example, spatial anxiety is found to induce more errors in directional pointing tasks. In an experiment where participants were required to use directional instructions to move a toy car in a virtual three-dimensional environment, those with higher reported spatial anxiety performed with less accuracy. As spatial anxiety increases, pointing accuracy decreases, and navigation errors increase significantly. This effect has been also shown in patients with cognitive impairment. Early detection might therefore allow for timely therapeutical intervention, e.g., in Alzheimer's disease

Moreover, spatial anxiety has been shown to relate to gender differences in spatial abilities. Generally, women report higher levels of spatial anxiety than men. The use of orientation (based on map view) strategies in indoor or/and outdoor environment can be associated with lower levels of spatial anxiety. Women tend to report using route strategies more than orientation strategies, whereas men report the opposite. Spatial anxiety also contributes to gender differences in environment learning. Recent findings in university students indicate that men rely more than women upon distal gradient cues that provide information on both orientation and direction (i.e., hill lines) whereas women depend upon proximal pinpoint (i.e., landmark) cues more than other cue types when identifying a visual scene. The addition of an exogenous stressor would differentially alter the impact of spatial anxiety on performance in men and women by producing a higher perception of stress in women than males, which results in decreasing performance in females. The findings suggest that gender differences in distal gradient and new cue perception varied based on stress condition.

Some studies have discovered that acute stress can reduce memory for spatial locations, and people reporting difficulties in memorizing landmarks and directions when they are displaced also report higher levels of spatial anxiety. In addition, it has been demonstrated that people with Agoraphobia Disorder have reduced visuo-spatial working memory when they are required to process multiple spatial elements simultaneously. Specifically, in tasks where they were required to navigate using the landmarks independent of themselves (allocentric coordinates), visuo-spatial working memory deficits were shown to hinder their performance.

Bilateral vestibulopathy can cause higher levels of spatial anxiety, potentially related to hippocampal atrophy. Overall, the role of the vestibular system on spatial anxiety is not yet fully understood, but vestibular function plays a relevant role in emotion processing and the development of (vertigo-related) anxiety, as well as in spatial perception.

Possible explanations for the negative correlation between spatial anxiety and the ability to form cognitive map include: individuals lacking sense of their own position with respect to the external environment are more likely to get anxious when faced with unplanned navigation, and the anxiety about becoming lost itself may reduce the ability to attend to cues necessary for way-finding strategizing.

The influence of spatial anxiety can be counteracted by positive beliefs, such as spatial self-efficacy and confidence (i.e. as the belief that one will do well in cognitive tasks). For example, it has been demonstrated that confidence was a predictive factor for accuracy in mental rotation tasks, with participants being more accurate when they were more confident. When this factor was manipulated, the performance was significantly affected. Furthermore, having more self-perception of spatial self-efficacy has a positive role in supporting environment learning beyond the role of gender.

== See also ==
- Spatial cognition
- Agoraphobia
- Navigation
- Sex differences in psychology
