= Acute cerebellar ataxia of childhood =

Unsteady gait following viral infection within children

- Specialty: Pediatrics, neurology

Acute cerebellar ataxia of childhood is a childhood condition characterized by an unsteady gait, most likely secondary to an autoimmune response to infection, drug induced or paraneoplastic. The most common viruses causing acute cerebellar ataxia are chickenpox virus and Epstein–Barr virus, leading to a childhood form of post viral cerebellar ataxia. It is a diagnosis of exclusion.

== Signs and symptoms ==
Acute cerebellar ataxia usually follows 2–3 weeks after an infection. Onset is abrupt. Vomiting may be present at the onset but fever and nuchal rigidity characteristically are absent. Horizontal nystagmus is present in approximately 50% of cases.

- Truncal ataxia with deterioration of gait
- Slurred speech and nystagmus
- Afebrile

== Cause ==
Possible causes of acute cerebellar ataxia include varicella infection, as well as infection with influenza, Epstein–Barr virus, Coxsackie virus, Echo virus or mycoplasma.

== Diagnosis ==
Acute Cerebellar ataxia is a diagnosis of exclusion. Urgent CT scan is necessary to rule out cerebellar tumor or hemorrhage as cause of the ataxia; however in acute cerebellar ataxia, the CT will be normal. CSF studies are normal earlier in the course of disease. Later on CSF shows moderate elevation of proteins.

=== Differential diagnosis ===
- Brain tumors, including cerebellar astrocytoma, medulloblastoma, neuroblastoma
- Cerebellar contusion
- Subdural hematoma
- Toxins, including ethanol or anticonvulsants
- Cerebellar infarction or hemorrhage
- Meningitis
- Encephalitis
- Acute disseminated encephalomyelitis
- Multiple sclerosis

== Management ==
Supportive treatment is the only intervention for acute cerebellar ataxia of childhood. Symptoms may last as long as 2 or 3 months.

== Epidemiology ==
Acute cerebellar ataxia is the most common cause of unsteady gait in children. The condition is rare in children older than ten years of age. Most commonly acute cerebellar ataxia affects children between age 2 and 7 years.

== See also ==
- Gluten ataxia
