= Upper limb neurological examination =

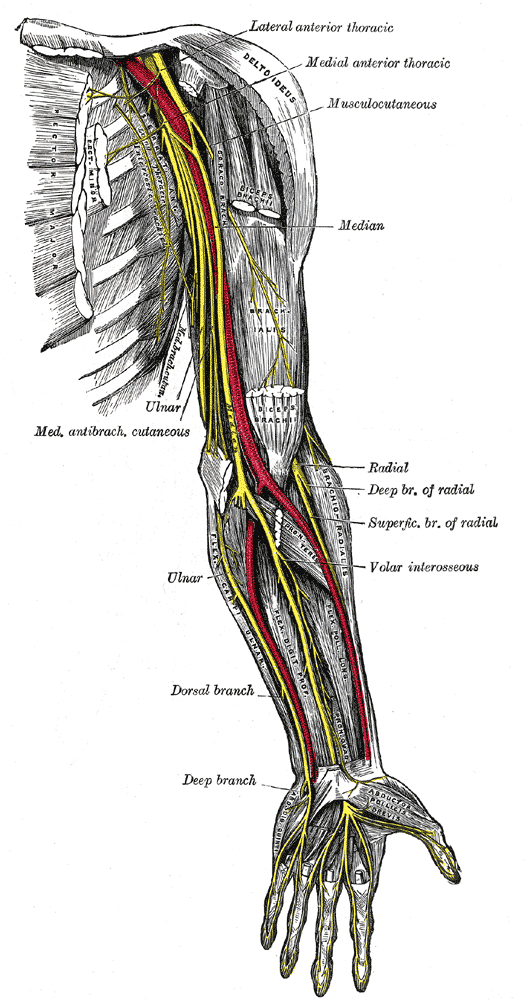
- Distribution of nerves in the upper limb
- Purpose: assess the motor and sensory neurons which supply the upper limbs

An upper limb neurological examination is part of the neurological examination, and is used to assess the motor and sensory neurons which supply the upper limbs. This assessment helps to detect any impairment of the nervous system, being used both as a screening and an investigative tool. The examination findings when combined with a detailed history of a patient, can help a doctor reach a specific or differential diagnosis. This would enable the doctor to commence treatment if a specific diagnosis has been made, or order further investigations if there are differential diagnoses.

== Structure of examination ==
The examination is performed in sequence:

1. General inspection
2. Muscle tone
3. Power
4. Reflexes
5. Coordination
6. Sensation

=== General inspection ===
The upper body is exposed and a general observation is made from the end of the bed. Signs of neurological disease include:

- Wasting: May suggest motor neuron disease or a lower motor neuron lesion. It could also indicate local infiltration of nerves such as the brachial plexus, in apical lung tumours, causing wasting of the small muscles of the hand.
- Fasciculation: These are small contractions of muscles seen as movements under the skin. They occur in lower motor neuron lesions.
- Involuntary movements: Different types exists, all of which are distressing to the patient and cause of embarrassment in public. They are classified into tremor, chorea, athetosis, hemiballismus, dystonia, myoclonus, and tics.

=== Muscle tone ===
The hand is grasped like a handshake and the arm is moved in various directions to determine the tone. The tone is the baseline contractions of the muscles at rest. The tone may be normal or abnormal which would indicate an underlying pathology. The tone could be lower than normal (floppy) or it could be higher (stiff or rigid).

=== Power ===
The strength of the muscles are tested in different positions against resistance.

=== Reflexes ===
There are 3 reflexes in the upper arm that are tested. These are the biceps, triceps and supinator reflex. The reflexes may be abnormally brisk or absent. In the latter, the reflex could be elicited through reinforcement by asking the patient to clench their jaw.

=== Coordination ===
Three separate aspects of coordination are tested:

==== Finger-nose test ====
This maneuver tests for dysmetria.

The examiner holds their hand in front of the patient, who is then asked to repeatedly touch their index finger to their nose and the examiner's finger. The distance between the examiner's hand and patient's nose should be larger than the forearm length of the patient, so that the patient need to move both their shoulder joint and elbow joint during the test instead of just moving the elbow joint.

Healthy individuals can touch accurately on their nose and examiner's hand with ease, while dysmetria patients will constantly miss the nose and the hand.

==== Rapid pronation-supination ====
This maneuver tests for dysdiadochokinesia.

The patient is asked to tap the palm of one hand with the fingers of the other, then rapidly turn over the fingers and tap the palm with the back of them, repeatedly. The patient is asked to perform the clapping as quickly as he could.

Dydiadochokinesia patient will be impaired in the rate of alternation, the completeness of the sequence, and in the variation in amplitude involving both motor coordination and sequencing.

==== Pronator drift ====
The arms are outstretched and patient is instructed to close their eyes. If the hands do not move, it is normal.

=== Sensation ===
The five aspects of sensation are tested:

1. Light touch - tested using cotton wool
2. Pain - tested with a neurological pin
3. Proprioception (sense of joint position) - tested by moving the thumb while the patients eyes are closed. Patient is then asked whether the thumb is moved up or down.
4. Vibration - tested with a 128 Hz tuning fork placed at the first joint of the thumb
5. Temperature - tested with hot and cold test tubes. Alternatively the cold tuning fork used for vibration sense, could be used.
