= Ataxia =

Neurological impairment of voluntary muscle movement

- Specialty: Neurology, Psychiatry
- Symptoms: Lack of coordination; Slurred speech; Trouble eating and swallowing; Deterioration of fine motor skills; Difficulty walking; Gait abnormalities; Eye movement abnormalities; Tremors; Heart problems

Ataxia (from Greek α- [a negative prefix] + -τάξις [order] = "lack of order") is a neurological sign consisting of lack of voluntary coordination of muscle movements that can include gait abnormality, speech changes, and abnormalities in eye movements, that indicates dysfunction of parts of the nervous system that coordinate movement, such as the cerebellum.

These nervous-system dysfunctions occur in several different patterns, with different results and different possible causes. Ataxia can be limited to one side of the body, which is referred to as hemiataxia. Friedreich's ataxia has gait abnormality as the most commonly presented symptom. Dystaxia is a mild degree of ataxia.

== Types ==
=== Cerebellar ===
The term cerebellar ataxia is used to indicate ataxia due to dysfunction of the cerebellum. The cerebellum is responsible for integrating a significant amount of neural information that is used to coordinate smoothly ongoing movements and to participate in motor planning. Although ataxia is not present with all cerebellar lesions, many conditions affecting the cerebellum do produce ataxia. People with cerebellar ataxia may have trouble regulating the force, range, direction, velocity, and rhythm of muscle contractions. This results in a characteristic type of irregular, uncoordinated movement that can manifest itself in many possible ways, such as asthenia, asynergy, delayed reaction time, and dyschronometria. Individuals with cerebellar ataxia could also display instability of gait, difficulty with eye movements, dysarthria, dysphagia, hypotonia, dysmetria, and dysdiadochokinesia. These deficits can vary depending on which cerebellar structures have been damaged, and whether the lesion is bi- or unilateral.

People with cerebellar ataxia may initially present with poor balance, which could be demonstrated as an inability to stand on one leg or perform tandem gait. As the condition progresses, walking is characterized by a widened base and high stepping, as well as staggering and lurching from side to side. Turning is also problematic and could result in falls. As cerebellar ataxia becomes severe, great assistance and effort are needed to stand and walk. Dysarthria, an impairment with articulation, may also be present and is characterized by "scanning" speech that consists of a slower rate, irregular rhythm, and variable volume. Also, slurring of speech, tremor of the voice, and ataxic respiration may occur. Cerebellar ataxia could result in incoordination of movement, particularly in the extremities. Overshooting (or hypermetria) occurs with finger-to-nose testing and heel-to-shin testing; thus, dysmetria is evident. Impairments with alternating movements (dysdiadochokinesia), as well as dysrhythmia, may also be displayed. Tremor of the head and trunk (titubation) may be seen in individuals with cerebellar ataxia.

Dysmetria is thought to be caused by a deficit in the control of interaction torques in multijoint motion. Interaction torques are created at an associated joint when the primary joint is moved. For example, if a movement required reaching to touch a target in front of the body, flexion at the shoulder would create a torque at the elbow, while extension of the elbow would create a torque at the wrist. These torques increase as the speed of movement increases and must be compensated for and adjusted to create coordinated movement. This may, therefore, explain decreased coordination at higher movement velocities and accelerations.

- Dysfunction of the vestibulocerebellum (flocculonodular lobe) impairs balance and the control of eye movements. This presents itself with postural instability, in which the person tends to separate his/her feet upon standing, to gain a wider base and to avoid titubation (bodily oscillations tending to be forward-backward ones). The instability is, therefore, worsened when standing with the feet together, regardless of whether the eyes are open or closed. This is a negative Romberg's test, or more accurately, it denotes the individual's inability to carry out the test, because the individual feels unstable even with open eyes.
- Dysfunction of the spinocerebellum (vermis and associated areas near the midline) presents itself with a wide-based "drunken sailor" gait (called truncal ataxia), characterised by uncertain starts and stops, lateral deviations, and unequal steps. As a result of this gait impairment, falling is a concern in patients with ataxia. Studies examining falls in this population show that 74–93% of patients have fallen at least once in the past year, and up to 60% admit to fear of falling.
- Dysfunction of the cerebrocerebellum (lateral hemispheres) presents as disturbances in carrying out voluntary, planned movements by the extremities (called appendicular ataxia). These include:
  - Intention tremor (coarse trembling, accentuated over the execution of voluntary movements, possibly involving the head and eyes, as well as the limbs and torso)
  - Peculiar writing abnormalities (large, unequal letters, irregular underlining)
  - A peculiar pattern of dysarthria (slurred speech, sometimes characterised by explosive variations in voice intensity despite a regular rhythm)
  - Inability to perform rapidly alternating movements, known as dysdiadochokinesia, occurs, and could involve rapidly switching from pronation to supination of the forearm. Movements become more irregular with speed increases.
  - Inability to judge distances or ranges of movement happens. This dysmetria is often seen as undershooting, hypometria, or overshooting, hypermetria, the required distance or range to reach a target. This is sometimes seen when a patient is asked to reach out and touch someone's finger or touch his or her own nose.
  - The rebound phenomenon, also known as the loss of the check reflex, is also sometimes seen in patients with cerebellar ataxia, for example, when patients are flexing their elbows isometrically against resistance. When the resistance is suddenly removed without warning, the patients' arms may swing up and even strike themselves. With an intact check reflex, the patients check and activates the opposing triceps to slow and stop the movement.
  - Patients may exhibit a constellation of subtle to overt cognitive symptoms, which are gathered under the terminology of Schmahmann's syndrome.

=== Sensory ===
The term sensory ataxia is used to indicate ataxia due to loss of proprioception, the loss of sensitivity to the positions of joint and body parts. This is generally caused by dysfunction of the dorsal columns of the spinal cord, because they carry proprioceptive information up to the brain. In some cases, the cause of sensory ataxia may instead be dysfunction of the various parts of the brain that receive positional information, including the cerebellum, thalamus, and parietal lobes.

Sensory ataxia presents itself with an unsteady "stomping" gait with heavy heel strikes, as well as a postural instability that is usually worsened when the lack of proprioceptive input cannot be compensated for by visual input, such as in poorly lit environments.

Physicians can find evidence of sensory ataxia during physical examination by having patients stand with their feet together and eyes shut. In affected patients, this will cause the instability to worsen markedly, producing wide oscillations and possibly a fall; this is called a positive Romberg's test. Worsening of the finger-pointing test with the eyes closed is another feature of sensory ataxia. Also, when patients are standing with arms and hands extended toward the physician, if the eyes are closed, the patients' fingers tend to "fall down" and then be restored to the horizontal extended position by sudden muscular contractions (the "ataxic hand").

=== Vestibular ===
The term vestibular ataxia is used to indicate ataxia due to dysfunction of the vestibular system, which in acute and unilateral cases is associated with prominent vertigo, nausea, and vomiting. In slow-onset, chronic bilateral cases of vestibular dysfunction, these characteristic manifestations may be absent, and dysequilibrium may be the sole presentation.

== Causes ==
The three types of ataxia have overlapping causes, so they can either coexist or occur in isolation. Cerebellar ataxia can have many causes despite normal neuroimaging.

=== Focal lesions ===
Any type of focal lesion of the central nervous system (such as stroke, brain tumor, multiple sclerosis, inflammatory [such as sarcoidosis], and "chronic lymphocytyc inflammation with pontine perivascular enhancement responsive to steroids syndrome" [CLIPPERS]) will cause the type of ataxia corresponding to the site of the lesion: cerebellar if in the cerebellum; sensory if in the dorsal spinal cord...to include cord compression by thickened ligamentum flavum or stenosis of the boney spinal canal...(and rarely in the thalamus or parietal lobe); or vestibular if in the vestibular system (including the vestibular areas of the cerebral cortex).

=== Exogenous substances (metabolic ataxia) ===
Exogenous substances that cause ataxia mainly do so because they have a depressant effect on central nervous system function. The most common example is ethanol (alcohol), which is capable of causing reversible cerebellar and vestibular ataxia. Chronic intake of ethanol causes atrophy of the cerebellum by oxidative and endoplasmic reticulum stresses induced by thiamine deficiency.

Other examples include various prescription drugs (e.g. most antiepileptic drugs have cerebellar ataxia as a possible adverse effect), Lithium level over 1.5mEq/L, synthetic cannabinoid HU-211 ingestion and various other medical and recreational drugs (e.g. ketamine, PCP or dextromethorphan, all of which are NMDA receptor antagonists that produce a dissociative state at high doses). A further class of pharmaceuticals which can cause short-term ataxia, especially in high doses, are benzodiazepines. Exposure to high levels of methylmercury, through consumption of fish with high mercury concentrations, is also a known cause of ataxia and other neurological disorders.

=== Radiation poisoning ===
Ataxia can be induced as a result of severe acute radiation poisoning with an absorbed dose of more than 30 grays. Furthermore, those with ataxia telangiectasia may have a high sensitivity towards gamma rays and x-rays.

=== Vitamin B_{12} deficiency ===
Vitamin B_{12} deficiency may cause, among several neurological abnormalities, overlapping cerebellar and sensory ataxia. Neuropsychological symptoms may include sense loss, difficulty in proprioception, poor balance, loss of sensation in the feet, changes in reflexes, dementia, and psychosis, which can be reversible with treatment. Complications may include a neurological complex known as subacute combined degeneration of spinal cord, and other neurological disorders.

=== Hypothyroidism ===
Symptoms of neurological dysfunction may be the presenting feature in some patients with hypothyroidism. These include reversible cerebellar ataxia, dementia, peripheral neuropathy, psychosis and coma. Most of the neurological complications improve completely after thyroid hormone replacement therapy.

=== Causes of isolated sensory ataxia ===
Peripheral neuropathies may cause generalised or localised sensory ataxia (e.g., a limb only) depending on the extent of the neuropathic involvement. Spinal disorders of various types may cause sensory ataxia from the lesioned level below, when they involve the dorsal columns.

=== Non-hereditary cerebellar degeneration ===
Non-hereditary causes of cerebellar degeneration include chronic alcohol use disorder, head injury, paraneoplastic and non-paraneoplastic autoimmune ataxia, high-altitude cerebral edema, celiac disease, normal-pressure hydrocephalus, and infectious or post-infectious cerebellitis.

=== Hereditary ataxias ===
Ataxia may depend on hereditary disorders consisting of degeneration of the cerebellum or of the spine; most cases feature both to some extent, and therefore present with overlapping cerebellar and sensory ataxia, even though one is often more evident than the other. Hereditary disorders causing ataxia include autosomal dominant ones such as spinocerebellar ataxia, episodic ataxia, and dentatorubropallidoluysian atrophy, as well as autosomal recessive disorders such as Friedreich's ataxia (sensory and cerebellar, with the former predominating) and Niemann–Pick disease, ataxia–telangiectasia (sensory and cerebellar, with the latter predominating), autosomal recessive spinocerebellar ataxia-14 and abetalipoproteinaemia. An example of X-linked ataxic condition is the rare fragile X-associated tremor/ataxia syndrome or FXTAS.

=== Arnold–Chiari malformation (congenital ataxia) ===
Arnold–Chiari malformation is a malformation of the brain. It consists of a downward displacement of the cerebellar tonsils and the medulla through the foramen magnum, sometimes causing hydrocephalus as a result of obstruction of cerebrospinal fluid outflow.

=== Succinic semialdehyde dehydrogenase deficiency ===
Succinic semialdehyde dehydrogenase deficiency is an autosomal-recessive gene disorder where mutations in the ALDH5A1 gene results in the accumulation of gamma-Hydroxybutyric acid (GHB) in the body. GHB accumulates in the nervous system and can cause ataxia as well as other neurological dysfunction.

=== Wilson's disease ===
Wilson's disease is an autosomal-recessive gene disorder whereby an alteration of the ATP7B gene results in an inability to properly excrete copper from the body. Copper accumulates in the liver and raises the toxicity levels in the nervous system causing demyelination of the nerves. This can cause ataxia as well as other neurological and organ impairments.

=== Gluten ataxia ===
A male with gluten ataxia: previous situation and evolution after three months of a gluten-free diet

Gluten ataxia is an autoimmune disease, which is triggered by the ingestion of gluten. Early diagnosis and treatment with a gluten-free diet can improve ataxia and prevent its progression. The effectiveness of the treatment depends on the elapsed time from the onset of the ataxia until diagnosis, because the death of neurons in the cerebellum as a result of gluten exposure is irreversible. It accounts for 40% of ataxias of unknown origin and 15% of all ataxias. Less than 10% of people with gluten ataxia present any gastrointestinal symptom and only about 40% have intestinal damage. It can co-occur with celiac disease and some maintain it is a presentation thereof. However, gluten ataxia is believed to be mediated by transglutaminase 6 antibodies, whereas celiac disease is associated with transglutaminase 2 antibodies. There is a continuum between presymptomatic ataxia and immune ataxias with clinical deficits. Gluten ataxia is classified as a primary auto-immune cerebellar ataxia (PACA).

=== Potassium pump ===
Malfunction of the sodium-potassium pump may be a factor in some ataxias. The Na^{+}/K^{+} pump has been shown to control and set the intrinsic activity mode of cerebellar Purkinje neurons. This suggests that the pump might not simply be a homeostatic, "housekeeping" molecule for ionic gradients, but could be a computational element in the cerebellum and the brain. Indeed, a ouabain block of Na^{+}/K^{+} pumps in the cerebellum of a live mouse results in it displaying ataxia and dystonia. Ataxia is observed for lower ouabain concentrations, and dystonia is observed at higher ouabain concentrations.

=== Cerebellar ataxia associated with anti-GAD antibodies ===
Antibodies against the enzyme glutamic acid decarboxylase (GAD: enzyme changing glutamate into GABA) cause cerebellar deficits. The antibodies impair motor learning and cause behavioral deficits. GAD antibodies related ataxia is part of the group called immune-mediated cerebellar ataxias. The antibodies induce a synaptopathy. The cerebellum is particularly vulnerable to autoimmune disorders. Cerebellar circuitry has capacities to compensate and restore function thanks to cerebellar reserve, gathering multiple forms of plasticity. LTDpathies gather immune disorders targeting long-term depression (LTD), a form of plasticity.

== Diagnosis ==
- Imaging studies – A CT scan or MRI of the brain might help determine potential causes. An MRI can sometimes show shrinkage of the cerebellum and other brain structures in people with ataxia. It may also show other treatable findings, such as a blood clot or benign tumour, that could be pressing on the cerebellum.
- Lumbar puncture (spinal tap) – A needle is inserted into the lower back (lumbar region) between two lumbar vertebrae to obtain a sample of cerebrospinal fluid for testing.
- Genetic testing – Determines whether the mutation that causes one of the hereditary ataxic conditions is present. Tests are available for many but not all of the hereditary ataxias.

== Treatment ==
The treatment of ataxia and its effectiveness depend on the underlying cause. Treatment may limit or reduce the effects of ataxia, but it is unlikely to eliminate them entirely. Recovery tends to be better in individuals with a single focal injury (such as stroke or a benign tumour), compared to those who have a neurological degenerative condition. A review of the management of degenerative ataxia was published in 2009. A small number of rare conditions presenting with prominent cerebellar ataxia are amenable to specific treatment, and recognition of these disorders is critical. Diseases include vitamin E deficiency, abetalipoproteinemia, cerebrotendinous xanthomatosis, Niemann–Pick type C disease, Refsum's disease, glucose transporter type 1 deficiency, episodic ataxia type 2, gluten ataxia, glutamic acid decarboxylase ataxia. Novel therapies target the RNA defects associated with cerebellar disorders, using in particular anti-sense oligonucleotides.

The movement disorders associated with ataxia can be managed by pharmacological treatments and through physical therapy and occupational therapy to reduce disability. Some drug treatments that have been used to control ataxia include: 5-hydroxytryptophan (5-HTP), idebenone, amantadine, physostigmine, L-carnitine or derivatives, trimethoprim/sulfamethoxazole, vigabatrin, phosphatidylcholine, acetazolamide, 4-aminopyridine, buspirone, and a combination of coenzyme Q_{10} and vitamin E.

Physical therapy requires a focus on adapting activity and facilitating motor learning for retraining specific functional motor patterns. A recent systematic review suggested that physical therapy is effective, but there is only moderate evidence to support this conclusion. The most commonly used physical therapy interventions for cerebellar ataxia are vestibular habituation, Frenkel exercises, proprioceptive neuromuscular facilitation (PNF), and balance training; however, therapy is often highly individualized and gait and coordination training are large components of therapy.

Current research suggests that, if a person can walk with or without a mobility aid, physical therapy should include an exercise program addressing five components: static balance, dynamic balance, trunk-limb coordination, stairs, and contracture prevention. Once the physical therapist determines that the individual can safely perform parts of the program independently, it is important that the individual be prescribed and regularly engage in a supplementary home exercise program that incorporates these components to improve long-term outcomes further. These outcomes include balance tasks, gait, and individual activities of daily living. While the improvements are attributed primarily to changes in the brain and not just the hip or ankle joints, it is still unknown whether the improvements are due to adaptations in the cerebellum or compensation by other areas of the brain.

Decomposition, simplification, or slowing of multijoint movement may also be an effective strategy that therapists may use to improve function in patients with ataxia. Training likely needs to be intense and focused—as indicated by one study performed with stroke patients experiencing limb ataxia who underwent intensive upper limb retraining. Their therapy consisted of constraint-induced movement therapy which resulted in improvements of their arm function. Treatment should likely include strategies to manage difficulties with everyday activities such as walking. Gait aids (such as a cane or walker) can be provided to decrease the risk of falls associated with impairment of balance or poor coordination. Severe ataxia may eventually lead to the need for a wheelchair. To obtain better results, possible coexisting motor deficits need to be addressed in addition to those induced by ataxia. For example, muscle weakness and decreased endurance could lead to increased fatigue and poorer movement patterns.

Several assessment tools are available to therapists and healthcare professionals working with patients with ataxia. The International Cooperative Ataxia Rating Scale (ICARS) is one of the most widely used and has been proven to have very high reliability and validity. Other tools that assess motor function, balance and coordination are also highly valuable to help the therapist track the progress of their patient, as well as to quantify the patient's functionality. These tests include, but are not limited to:

- The Berg Balance Scale
- Tandem Walking (to test for Tandem gaitability)
- Scale for the Assessment and Rating of Ataxia (SARA)
- tapping tests – The person must quickly and repeatedly tap their arm or leg while the therapist monitors the amount of dysdiadochokinesia.
- finger-nose testing – This test has several variations including finger-to-therapist's finger, finger-to-finger, and alternate nose-to-finger.

== Other uses ==
The term "ataxia" is sometimes used in a broader sense to indicate a lack of coordination in some physiological process. Examples include optic ataxia (lack of coordination between visual inputs and hand movements, resulting in inability to reach and grab objects) and ataxic respiration (lack of coordination in respiratory movements, usually due to dysfunction of the respiratory centres in the medulla oblongata).

Optic ataxia may be caused by lesions to the posterior parietal cortex, which is responsible for combining and expressing positional information and relating it to movement. Outputs of the posterior parietal cortex include the spinal cord, brain stem motor pathways, pre-motor and pre-frontal cortex, basal ganglia, and the cerebellum. Some neurons in the posterior parietal cortex are modulated by intention. Optic ataxia is usually part of Balint's syndrome, but can be seen in isolation with injuries to the superior parietal lobule, as it represents a disconnection between the visual-association cortex and the frontal premotor and motor cortex.

== See also ==
- Ataxic cerebral palsy
- Locomotor ataxia
- Bruns apraxia
