= Mauricio Delgado =

Brazilian-American neuroscientist

- Born: São Paulo, Brazil
- Education: Wesleyan University; University of Pittsburgh
- Awards: Presidential Early Career Award for Scientists and Engineers (2010)
- Scientific career
- Fields: Neuroscience
- Institutions: Rutgers University Newark
- Thesis: FMRI studies of the role of the striatum in processing reward -related information: Effects of valence, magnitude and motivation (2002)
- Doctoral advisor: Julie Fiez

Mauricio R. Delgado is a Brazilian-born American neuroscientist who is professor and chair of the Psychology Department at Rutgers University Newark. He is known for his research on the neuroscience of decision-making.
