= Truncal ataxia =

Wide-based "drunken sailor" gait symptom

- Other names: Trunk ataxia, Ataxic gait
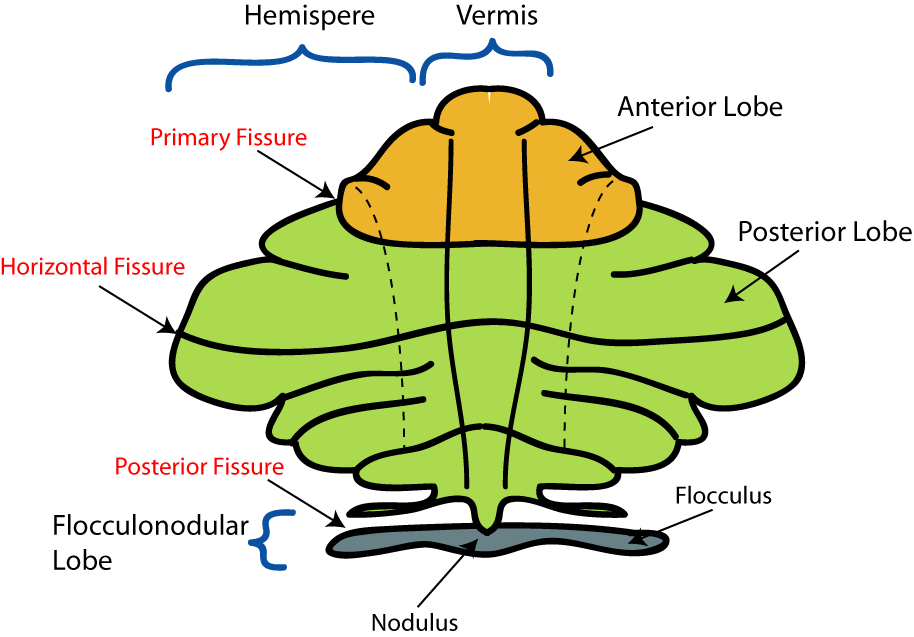
- Caused by midline damage to the cerebellar vermis
- Specialty: Neurology
- Symptoms: "drunken sailor" gait characterised by uncertain starts and stops, falling
- Causes: Spinocerebellar Ataxia (Lesion in Flocculonodular Lobe OR Vestibulo-cerebellum)

Truncal ataxia (or trunk ataxia) is a wide-based "drunken sailor" gait characterized by uncertain starts and stops, lateral deviations and unequal steps. It is an instability of the trunk and often seen during sitting. It is most visible when shifting position or walking heel-to-toe.

As a result of this gait impairment, falling is a concern in patients with ataxia.

Truncal ataxia affects the muscles closer to the body such as the trunk, shoulder girdle and hip girdle. It is involved in gait stability.

Truncal ataxia is different from appendicular ataxia. Appendicular ataxia affects the movements of the arms and legs. It is caused by lesions of the cerebellar hemispheres.

== Causes ==
Truncal ataxia is caused by midline damage to the cerebellar vermis. There are at least 34 conditions that cause truncal ataxia.

=== Common ===
- Alcohol intoxication
- Cerebellar infarction
- Cerebellar hemorrhage
- Cerebellar ataxia
- Multiple sclerosis
- Friedreich's ataxia
- Drugs such as Benzodiazepines, Lithium, Phenytoin

=== Uncommon ===
- Adrenoleukodystrophy
- Ataxia oculomotor apraxia type 1
- Branchial myoclonus
- Christianson syndrome
- Dandy–Walker syndrome
- Dysequilibrium syndrome
- Epilepsy
- Episodic ataxia
- Post viral cerebellar ataxia
- Gerstmann–Sträussler–Scheinker syndrome
- Machado–Joseph disease
- Microcephaly
- N-acetylaspartate deficiency
- Neuhauser–Eichner–Opitz syndrome
- Paraneoplastic cerebellar degeneration
- Polymicrogyria
- Rett syndrome
- Spinocerebellar ataxia
- Vertebral dissection
