= List of diseases (Q) =

This is a list of diseases starting with the letter "Q".

== Q ==
- Q fever
- Qazi–Markouizos syndrome
- Quadrantanopia
- Quadriceps sparing myopathy
- Quadriceps tendon rupture
- Quadriparesis
- Quadriplegia
- Quebec platelet disorder
- Queensland tick typhus
- Quincke's edema
- Quinism
- Quinquaud's decalvans folliculitis
- Quinsy
