= Julie Fiez =

- Occupations: Professor of Psychology and Neuroscience

Academic background
- Education: Emory University; Washington University in St. Louis

Julie A. Fiez is a cognitive neuroscientist known for her research on the neural basis of speech, language, reading, working memory, and learning in healthy and patient populations. She is Professor of Psychology and Neuroscience at the Learning Research and Development Center and the Center for the Neural Basis of Cognition at the University of Pittsburgh. She is also Adjunct Faculty in the Department of Psychology at Carnegie Mellon University.

Fiez has been honored with several awards throughout her career. In 1997, she received the Wiley Young Investigator Award in Human Brain Mapping from the Organization for Human Brain Mapping. She was awarded the 2001 Chancellor's Distinguished Research Award from the University of Pittsburgh in the junior research category "for outstanding contributions in teaching, research, and public service." In 2002, she received the American Psychological Association Distinguished Scientific Award for Early Career Contribution to Psychology "for research that has combined the techniques of modern functional brain imaging with those of cognitive psychology to study how the brain processes single words."

== Biography ==
In 1987, Fiez completed her B.S. in biology at Emory University, and in 1992, she received her PhD in neuroscience from Washington University, where she worked under the supervision of Steven Peterson. She subsequently completed a postdoctoral fellowship at the University of Iowa. Fiez joined the faculty of the Department of Psychology at the University of Pittsburgh in 1997. She is the co-director of the Behavioral Brain Research Training Program at Carnegie Mellon University.

== Research ==
Fiez is known for her research in neuroscience, specifically on the cerebellum and how it is involved in processing information separately and in unison with the frontal lobes, and its functions that extend beyond motor control. Fiez's research on the role of the cerebellum and its influence on non-motor behavior has focused on how the cerebellum interacts with non-motor areas of the brain. Using neuroimaging, Fiez and her colleagues found evidence for closed-loop circuits in cerebro-cerebellar interactions that indicate the role of the cerebellum not only in movement, but also in cognition. In her research, she uses behavioral, neuropsychological, and neuroimaging methods to discover how the brain gives rise to the mind.

Fiez and her colleagues have used positron emission tomography to study distinct functions of the cerebellum and non-motor cortical areas of the frontal lobe, also known as the fronto-cerebellar dissociation. Such studies have identified differences in brain activity in the left-frontal and right-cerebellar parts of the brain when research participants are given simple verbal response tasks, such as generating associations between nouns and verbs. Her research team also used positron emission tomography to study short-term memory and discovered the dorsolateral prefrontal cortex to be active in short-term maintenance of verbal and nonverbal information while the left frontal opercular regions were only linked to verbal memory.

Fiez and Petersen used neuroimaging to identify the involvement of multiple brain areas in word reading, including left-lateralized regions in occipital and occipitotemporal cortex, the left frontal operculum, bilateral regions in the cerebellum, primary motor cortex, and the superior and middle temporal cortex, and medial regions in the supplementary motor area and anterior cingulate. In other research, Fiez and her colleagues used mixed methods, including electrical brain simulation, to elaborate on the long debated visual word form hypothesis. They found that stimulating and surgically removing the left midfusiform gyrus of a patient made the patient unable to recognize words or letters; these and other findings indicate the involvement of this area as part of a visual word form system specialized for representing orthography in the brain.

== Representative publications ==
- Fiez, J. A., Balota, D. A., Raichle, M. E., & Petersen, S. E. (1999). Effects of lexicality, frequency, and spelling-to-sound consistency on the functional anatomy of reading. Neuron, 24(1), 205–218.
- Fiez, J. A. (1997). Phonology, semantics, and the role of the left inferior prefrontal cortex. Human Brain Mapping, 5(2), 79–83.
- Fiez, J. A., Petersen, S. E., Cheney, M. K., & Raichle, M. E. (1992). Impaired non-motor learning and error detection associated with cerebellar damage: A single case study. Brain, 115(1), 155–178.
- Petersen, S. E., & Fiez, J. A. (1993). The processing of single words studied with positron emission tomography. Annual Review of Neuroscience, 16(1), 509–530.
- Raichle, M. E., Fiez, J. A., Videen, T. O., MacLeod, A. M. K., Pardo, J. V., Fox, P. T., & Petersen, S. E. (1994). Practice-related changes in human brain functional anatomy during nonmotor learning. Cerebral Cortex, 4(1), 8-26.
- Strick, P. L., Dum, R. P., & Fiez, J. A. (2009). Cerebellum and nonmotor function. Annual Review of Neuroscience, 32, 413–434.
- Tricomi, E. M., Delgado, M. R., & Fiez, J. A. (2004). Modulation of caudate activity by action contingency. Neuron, 41(2), 281–292.
