= Ocular dysmetria =

- Specialty: Ophthalmology
- Differential diagnosis: lesion in cerebellum

Ocular dysmetria is a form of dysmetria that involves the constant under- or over-shooting of the eyes when attempting to focus gaze on something.

Ocular dysmetria indicates lesions in the cerebellum, which is the brain region responsible for coordinating movement. It is a symptom of several neurological conditions including multiple sclerosis.

It is a condition that can cause symptoms similar to sea sickness.
