= Diadochokinesia =

Diadochokinesia or diadochokinesis is the ability to make antagonistic movements in quick succession, alternately bringing a limb into opposite positions, as of flexion and extension or of pronation and supination. Speech-language pathology defines it as the speed necessary to stop a determined motor impulse and substitute it with its opposite. The relative timing of this kind of movements is also called alternate motion rates (AMR) or sequential motor rates (SMR).

Loss of this ability, called dysdiadochokinesia, is a characteristic sign of cerebellar diseases. Many clinical tests may be employed to test for such disturbances.

- Alternating movements: Patient is told e.g. to pronate and supinate their hands in rapid succession, holding forearms vertically. In cerebellar diseases, the movements are irregular and inaccurate; in case of the pyramidal tract lesion the motion may be slowed or incomplete.
- Stewart-Holmes rebound sign: Patient tries to flex the elbow against applied resistance. When physician's grip is suddenly released, the patient should be able to deter it from rebounding. With cerebellar disease, the forearm may sway in several cycles. The patient may even strike themself if not guarded.
- Various instrumental techniques can be used to investigate speech motor skills, such as imaging movement transduction and point tracking.

== See also ==
- Adiadochokinesia
- Dysdiadochokinesia
