= Quinism =

Neuropsychiatric quinism is a chronic encephalopathy due to intoxication by chloroquine, quinacrine, mefloquine, and tafenoquine. It is associated with brain dysfunction and brainstem dysfunction. It may be confused as posttraumatic stress disorder (PTSD) and traumatic brain injury (TBI). In the opinion of one medical author it "may have been widely unrecognized in veteran populations, and its symptoms misattributed to other causes." Symptoms include, but are not limited to, limbic encephalopathy and neurotoxic vestibulopathy.

== Symptoms ==
This neuropsychiatric syndrome is defined by several symptoms that distinguish it from others:

=== Very high probability ===
- delirium
- confusion
- disorientation

=== Moderate probability ===
- dementia
- amnesia
- seizures

=== Prodromal ===
- anxiety
- depression
- sleep disturbance
- abnormal dreams
- dizziness
- vertigo
- paresthesias
