= Spatial cognition =

Acquisition, organization, and use of knowledge about spatial environments

In cognitive psychology, spatial cognition is the acquisition, organization, utilization, and revision of knowledge about spatial environments. It is most about how animals, including humans, behave within space and the knowledge they built around it, rather than space itself. These capabilities enable individuals to manage basic and high-level cognitive tasks in everyday life. Numerous disciplines (such as cognitive psychology, neuroscience, artificial intelligence, geographic information science, cartography, etc.) work together to understand spatial cognition in different species, especially in humans. Thereby, spatial cognition studies also have helped to link cognitive psychology and neuroscience. Scientists in both fields work together to figure out what role spatial cognition plays in the brain as well as to determine the surrounding neurobiological infrastructure.

In humans, spatial cognition is closely related to how people talk about their environment, find their way in new surroundings, and plan routes. Thus a wide range of studies is based on participants reports, performance measures and similar, for example in order to determine cognitive reference frames that allow subjects to perform. In this context the implementation of virtual reality becomes more and more widespread among researchers, since it offers the opportunity to confront participants with unknown environments in a highly controlled manner.

Spatial cognition can be seen from a psychological point of view, meaning that people's behaviour within that space is key. When people behave in space, they use cognitive maps, the most evolved form of spatial cognition. When using cognitive maps, information about landmarks and the routes between landmarks are stored and used. This knowledge can be built from various sources; from a tightly coordinated vision and locomotion (movement), but also from map symbols, verbal descriptions, and computer-based pointing systems. According to Montello, space is implicitly referring to a person's body and their associated actions. He mentions different kinds of space; figural space which is a space smaller than the body, vista space which the space is more extended than the human body, environmental space which is learned by locomotion, and geographical space which is the biggest space and can only be learned through cartographic representation.

Space is represented in the human brain, this can also lead to distortions. When perceiving space and distance, a distortion can occur. Distances are perceived differently on whether they are considered between a given location and a location that has a high cognitive saliency, meaning that it stands out. Different perceived locations and distances can have a "reference point", which are better known than others, more frequently visited and more visible. There are other kinds of distortions as well. Furthermore, there the distortion in distance estimation and the distortion in angle alignment. Distortion in angle alignment means that your personal north will be viewed as "the north". The map is mentally represented according to the orientation of the personal point of view of learning. Since perceived distortion is "subjective" and not necessarily correlated with "objective distance", distortions can happen in this phenomenon too. There can be an overestimation in downtown routes, routes with turns, curved routes and borders or obstacles.

== Spatial knowledge ==
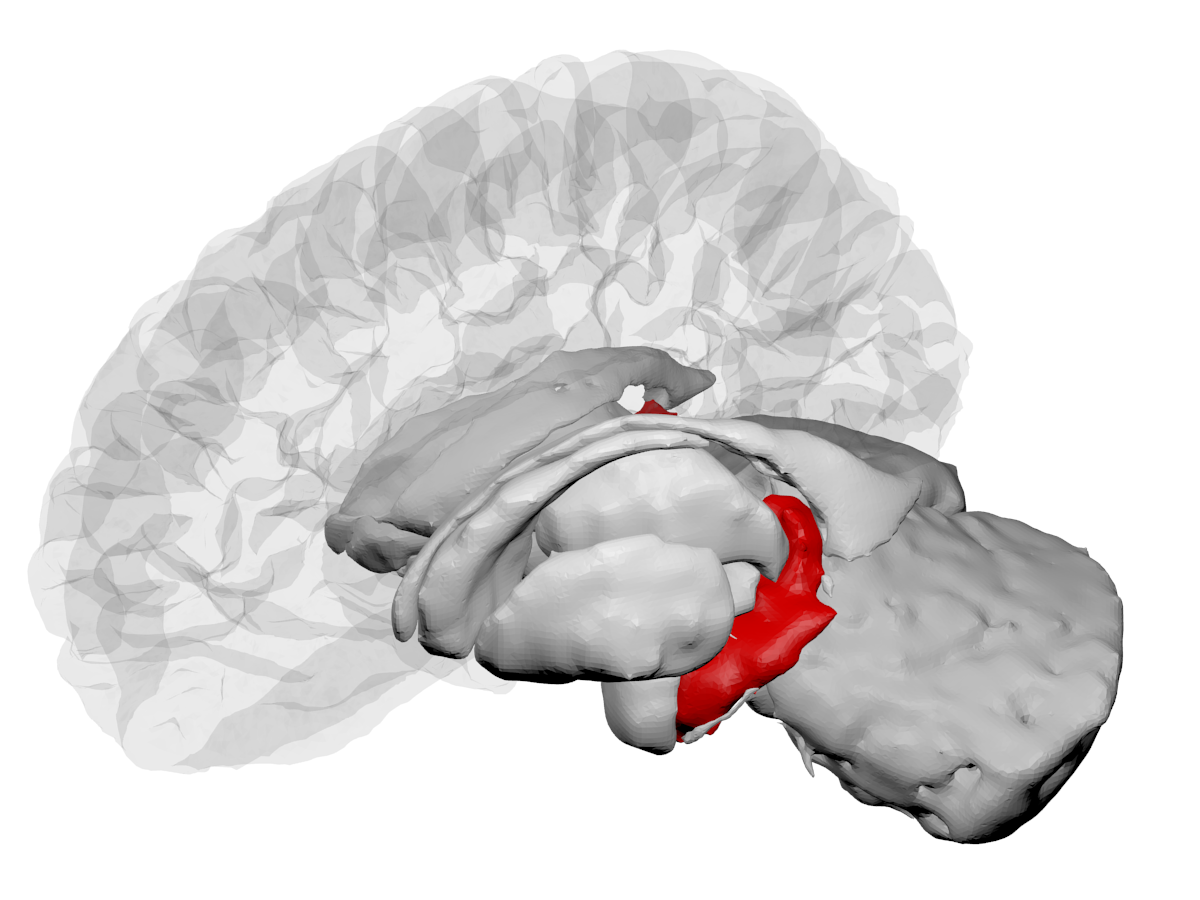
The hippocampus is involved in spatial cognition, and spatial memory

A classical approach to the acquisition of spatial knowledge, proposed by Siegel & White in 1975, defines three types of spatial knowledge – landmarks, route knowledge and survey knowledge – and draws a picture of these three as stepstones in a successive development of spatial knowledge.

Within this framework, landmarks can be understood as salient objects in the environment of an actor, which are memorized without information about any metric relations at first. By traveling between landmarks, route knowledge evolves, which can be seen as sequential information about the space which connects landmarks. Finally, increased familiarity with an environment allows the development of so-called survey knowledge, which integrates both landmarks and routes and relates it to a fixed coordinate system, i.e. in terms of metric relations and alignment to absolute categories like compass bearings etc. This results in abilities like taking shortcuts never taken before, for example.

More recently, newer findings challenged this stairway-like model of acquisition of spatial knowledge. Whereas familiarity with an environment seems to be a crucial predictor of navigational performance indeed, in many cases even survey knowledge can be established after minimal exploration of a new environment.

In this context, Daniel R. Montello proposed a new framework, indicating, that the changes in spatial knowledge ongoing with growing experience are rather quantitative than qualitative, i. e. different types of spatial knowledge become just more precise and confident. Furthermore, the use of these different types seems to be predominantly task-dependent, which leads to the conclusion that spatial navigation in everyday life requires multiple strategies with different emphasis on landmarks, routes and overall survey knowledge.

== Space classification ==
The space can be classified according to its extension as proposed by Montello, distinguishing between figural space, vista space, environmental space and geographical space. Figural space is the first and most restricted space that refers to the area that a person's body covers without any movement, including objects that can be easily reached. Vista space is the second subspace that refers to the space beyond the body but that is still close enough to be completely visualized without moving, for example, a room. Environmental space is the third subspace which is said to "contain" the body because of its large size and can only be fully explored through movement since all objects and space are not directly visible, like in a city. Environmental space is the most relevant subspace to humans for navigation because they best allow for movement throughout space in order to understand our environment. Geographical space is the last level because it is so large that it can not be explored through movement alone and can only be fully understood through cartographic representations which can illustrate an entire continent on a map.

== Reference frames ==
In order to build spatial knowledge, people construct a cognitive reality in which they compute their environment based on a reference point. This framing of the environment is a reference frame.

Usually there is a distinction made between egocentric (Latin ego: "I") and allocentric (ancient Greek allos: "another, external") reference frames; Egocentric frame of reference refers to placing yourself in the environment and viewing it in the first person, which means that objects' locations are understood relative to yourself. The egocentric frame of reference is centered around the body. Allocentric frame of reference on the other hand, refers to objects' location based on other objects or landmarks around it. Allocentric frame of reference is centered around the world around you, not around yourself. However, a third distinction can also be made, namely the geocentric reference frame. It is similar to the allocentric reference frame in the way that it has the capacity to encode a location independent from the position of the observer. It achieves this by encoding the space relative to axes that are distributed over an extended space, not by referring to salient landmarks. The geocentric space is most commonly coordinated in terms of longitude and latitude. The difference between an allocentric reference frame and a geocentric reference frame is that an allocentric reference frame is used for smaller-scale environments, whereas a geocentric reference frame is used for large-scale environments, like earth.

Whilst spatial information can be stored into these different frames, they already seem to develop together in early stages of childhood and appear to be necessarily used in combination in order to solve everyday life tasks.

A reference frame can also be used while navigating in space. Here, information is encoded in a way that it effects how we memorize it. This reference frame is used when the observer has to communicate with another person about the objects contained in that space.

When navigating a space, an observer can take on either a route perspective or a survey perspective. A route perspective is when the observer navigates in relation to their own body and location, whereas a survey perspective is a bird-eye view of the environment, in order to navigate a space. The usage of a route perspective has no influence on the survey perspective in the activation of the brain, and vice versa. A perspective can be purely route or survey, but often it is a mix of the two that is used in navigation. People can switch between the two seamlessly, and often without noticing.

Active navigation appears to have a bigger impact on the establishment of route knowledge, whereas the use of a map seemingly better supports survey knowledge about more large-scaled complex environments.

== Individual differences ==
There are also individual differences when it comes to experiencing space and the spatial cognition that people have. When looking at individual differences, it appears that most people have a preference for one reference frame with a different use of strategies to represent space. Some people have an inclination towards a route view (also called route strategy), while others have a preference towards a survey view (also called survey or orientation strategy). The people that prefer a route perspective also tend to describe a space more in an egocentric frame of reference. People who have an inclination towards a survey perspective also tend to use an allocentric frame of reference more often. It has been observed that the latter perform better in navigational tasks when they have to learn a route from a map. These individual differences are self-reported with questionnaires.

However, the perspective choice is also influenced by characteristics of the environment. When there is a single path in the environment, people usually choose to employ a route perspective. When the environment is open and filled with landmarks, however, people tend to choose a survey perspective.

In this context, a discussion came up about different reference frames, which are the frameworks wherein spatial information is encoded. In general, two of them can be distinguished as the egocentric (Latin ego: "I") and the allocentric (ancient Greek allos: "another, external") reference frame.

Within an egocentric reference frame, spatial information is encoded in terms of relations to the physical body of a navigator, whereas the allocentric reference frame defines relations of objects among each other, that is independent of the physical body of an "observer" and thus in a more absolute way, which takes metrical conditions and general alignments like cardinal directions into account. This suggests, that route knowledge, which is supported by direct navigation, is more likely to be encoded within an egocentric reference frame and survey knowledge, which is supported by map learning, to be more likely to be encoded within an allocentric reference frame in turn. Furthermore, an interaction between egocentric and allocentric view is possible. This combination is mostly used when imagining a spatial environment, and this creates a richer representation of the environment. However, when a perspective that has not yet been discovered, it is more demanding to use this technique.

== Distortion ==
As there are biases in other topics of psychology, there are also biases within the concept of spatial cognition. People make systematic errors when they utilize or try to retain information from spatial representations of the environment, such as geographic maps. This shows that their mental representation of the maps and the knowledge they reflect are systematically distorted. Distortions are repetitive errors (bias) that people show in their cognitive maps when they are asked to estimate distances or angles. When an organism’s natural spatial perception is harmed, spatial distortion arises. This can be created experimentally in a variety of sensory modalities. Different types of distortions exist.

First of all, people tend to make errors when it comes to estimating a distance. When compared to their true measurements on a curved surface of the globe, there is a misconception of shape, size, distance, or direction between geographical landmarks. This appears to happen because you cannot display 3D surfaces into two perfect dimensions. People tend to regularize their cognitive maps by distorting the position of relatively small features (e.g., cities) to make them conform with the position of larger features (e.g., state boundaries). Our route lengths tend to be overestimated, routes with major bends and curves are estimated longer than lineair routes. When interpreting the geographical relationships between two locations that are in separate geographical or political entities, people make enormous systematic errors. The presence of a border, physical as well as emotional, contributes to biases in estimating distances between elements. People tend to overestimate the distance between two cities that belonged to two different regions or countries. The distortion of distance might also be caused by the presence of salient landmarks. Some environmental features are not cognitively equal; some may be larger, older, more well-known or more central in our daily life activities. These landmarks are frequently used as reference elements for less salient elements. When one element in a location is more salient, the distance between the reference point and the other point is estimated as shorter.

Second, there is a distortion when it comes to alignment. Alignment means arrangement in a straight line. When objects are aligned with each other it is much easier to estimate the distance between these objects and to switch between different egocentric viewpoints of both objects. When a mental representation of any spatial environment needs to be created, people tend to have way more errors when the object in a spatial environment are not aligned with one another. This is especially the case when the different objects are memorized separately. When a person sees an object, there will be less errors in spatial cognition when the placement of this object is facing the person's egocentric north. The performance within spatial cognition is the best when the orientation is north-facing and decreases linearly with the angle of misalignment.

Finally, the angle in which an object is placed in relation to another object, plays a major role in having distortions when it comes to spatial cognition. The amount of angular errors increased significantly when the angle between two objects exceeds 90 degrees. This phenomenon occurs in all age groups, e.g. younger, middle-aged and older adults. When an angle is unknown and has to be estimated, people tend to guess close to 90 degrees. Besides that, the angular error also increases when the object or place towards which we are pointing (outside our visual field) is further away from our egocentric space. Familiarity plays an important role. Pointing errors are less towards places that are familiar than towards unfamiliar places. When people have to use their spatial memory to guess an angle, forward errors are significantly smaller than backward errors, implying that memorizing the opposite direction is more difficult than memorizing the forward direction of travel.

== Coding ==
There are many strategies used to spatially encode the environment, and they are often used together within the same task. In a recent study, König et aliae provided further evidence by letting participants learn the positions of streets and houses from an interactive map. Participants reproduced their knowledge in both relative and absolute terms by indicating the positions of houses and streets in relation to one another and their absolute locations using cardinal directions. Some participants were allowed three seconds to form their description, while others were not given a time limit. Their conclusions show that positions of houses were best remembered in relative tasks, while streets were best remembered in absolute tasks, and that increasing allotted time for cognitive reasoning improved performance for both.

These findings suggest, that circumscribed objects like houses, which would be sensory available at one moment during an active exploration, are more likely to be encoded in a relative/binary coded way and that time for cognitive reasoning allows the conversion into an absolute/unitary coded format, which is the deduction of their absolute position in line with cardinal directions, compass bearings etc. Contrary, bigger and more abstract objects like streets are more likely to be encoded in an absolute manner from the beginning.

That confirms the view of mixed strategies, in this case that spatial information of different objects is coded in distinct ways within the same task. Moreover, the orientation and location of objects like houses seems to be primarily learned in an action-oriented way, which is also in line with an enactive framework for human cognition.

== Sex differences ==
In a study of two congeneric rodent species, sex differences in hippocampal size were predicted by sex-specific patterns of spatial cognition. Hippocampal size is known to correlate positively with maze performance in laboratory mouse strains and with selective pressure for spatial memory among passerine bird species. In polygamous vole species (Rodentia: Microtus), males range more widely than females in the field and perform better on laboratory measures of spatial ability; both of these differences are absent in monogamous vole species. Ten females and males were taken from natural populations of two vole species, the polygamous meadow vole, M. pennsylvanicus, and the monogamous pine vole, M. pinetorum. Only in the polygamous species do males have larger hippocampi relative to the entire brain than do females. This study shows that spatial cognition can vary depending on sex.

One study aimed to determine whether male cuttlefish (Sepia officinalis; cephalopod mollusc) range over a larger area than females and whether this difference is associated with a cognitive dimorphism in orientation abilities. First, the distance travelled by sexually immature and mature cuttlefish of both sexes when placed in an open field was assessed (test 1). Second, cuttlefish were trained to solve a spatial task in a T-maze, and the spatial strategy preferentially used (right/left turn or visual cues) was determined (test 2). The results showed that sexually mature males travelled a longer distance in test 1, and were more likely to use visual cues to orient in test 2, compared with the other three groups.

== Navigation ==
Navigation is the ability of animals including humans to locate, track, and follow paths to arrive at a desired destination.

Navigation requires information about the environment to be acquired from the body and landmarks of the environment as frames of reference to create a mental representation of the environment, forming a cognitive map. Humans navigate by transitioning between different spaces and coordinating both egocentric and allocentric frames of reference.

Navigation has two major components: locomotion and wayfinding. Locomotion is the process of movement from one place to another, in animals including humans. Locomotion helps you understand an environment by moving through a space in order to create a mental representation of it. Wayfinding is defined as an active process of following or deciding upon a path between one place to another through mental representations. It involves processes such as representation, planning and decision which help to avoid obstacles, to stay on course or to regulate pace when approaching particular objects.

Navigation and wayfinding can be approached in the environmental space. According to Dan Montello's space classification, there are four levels of space with the third being environmental. The environmental space represents a very large space, like a city, and can only be fully explored through movement since all objects and space are not directly visible. Also Barbara Tversky systematized the space, but this time taking into consideration the three dimensions that correspond to the axes of the human body and its extensions: above/below, front/back and left/right. Tversky ultimately proposed a fourfold classification of navigable space: space of the body, space around the body, space of navigation and space of graphics.

=== Human navigation ===
In human navigation people visualize different routes in their minds to plan how to get from one place to another. The things which they rely on to plan these routes vary from person to person and are the basis of differing navigational strategies.

Some people use measures of distance and absolute directional terms (north, south, east, and west) in order to visualize the best pathway from point to point. The use of these more general, external cues as directions is considered part of an allocentric navigation strategy. Allocentric navigation is typically seen in males and is beneficial primarily in large and/or unfamiliar environments. This likely has some basis in evolution when males would have to navigate through large and unfamiliar environments while hunting. The use of allocentric strategies when navigating primarily activates the hippocampus and parahippocampus in the brain. This navigation strategy relies more on a mental, spatial map than visible cues, giving it an advantage in unknown areas but a flexibility to be used in smaller environments as well. The fact that it is mainly males that favor this strategy is likely related to the generalization that males are better navigators than females as it is better able to be applied in a greater variety of settings.

Egocentric navigation relies on more local landmarks and personal directions (left/right) to navigate and visualize a pathway. This reliance on more local and well-known stimuli for finding their way makes it difficult to apply in new locations, but is instead most effective in smaller, familiar environments. Evolutionarily, egocentric navigation likely comes from our ancestors who would forage for their food and need to be able to return to the same places daily to find edible plants. This foraging usually occurred in relatively nearby areas and was most commonly done by the females in hunter-gatherer societies. Females, today, are typically better at knowing where various landmarks are and often rely on them when giving directions. Egocentric navigation causes high levels of activation in the right parietal lobe and prefrontal regions of the brain that are involved in visuospatial processing.

Franz and Mallot proposed a navigation hierarchy in Robotics and Autonomous Systems 30 (2006):

	Behavioural prerequisite	Navigation competence
Local navigation
Search	Goal recognition	Finding the goal without active goal orientation
Direction-following	Align course with local direction	Finding the goal from one direction
Aiming	Keep goal in front	Finding a salient goal from a catchment area
Guidance	Attain spatial relation to the surrounding objects	Finding a goal defined by its relation to the surroundings
Way-finding
Recognition-triggered response	Association sensory pattern-action	Following fixed routes
Topological navigation	Route integration, route planning	Flexible concatenation of route segments
Survey navigation	Embedding into a common reference frame	Finding paths over novel terrain

=== Wayfinding taxonomy ===
There are two types of human wayfinding: aided and unaided. Aided wayfinding requires a person to use various types of media, such as maps, GPS, directional signage, etc., in their navigation process which generally involves low spatial reasoning and is less cognitively demanding.

Unaided wayfinding involves no such devices for the person who is navigating. Unaided wayfinding can be subdivided into a taxonomy of tasks depending on whether it is undirected or directed, which basically makes the distinction of whether there is a precise destination or not: undirected wayfinding means that a person is simply exploring an environment for pleasure without any set destination.

Directed wayfinding, instead, can be further subdivided into search vs. target approximation. Search means that a person does not know where the destination is located and must find it either in an unfamiliar environment, which is labeled as an uninformed search, or in a familiar environment, labeled as an informed search.

In target approximation, on the other hand, the location of the destination is known to the navigator but a further distinction is made based on whether the navigator knows how to arrive or not to the destination. Path following means that the environment, the path, and the destination are all known which means that the navigator simply follows the path they already know and arrive at the destination without much thought. For example, when you are in your city and walking on the same path as you normally take from your house to your job or university.

However, path finding means that the navigator knows where the destination is but does not know the route they have to take to arrive at the destination: you know where a specific store is but you do not know how to arrive there or what path to take. If the navigator does not know the environment, it is called path search which means that only the destination is known while neither the path nor the environment is: you are in a new city and need to arrive at the train station but do not know how to get there.

Path planning, on the other hand, means that the navigator knows both where the destination is and is familiar with the environment so they only need to plan the route or path that they should take to arrive at their target. For example, if you are in your city and need to get to a specific store that you know the destination of but do not know the specific path you need to take to get there.

=== Individual differences in navigation and wayfinding ===
Navigation and wayfinding may differ between people by gender, age, and other attributes. In the spatial cognition domain, such factors can be:

- Visuospatial abilities. i.e. the generation, retaining, and transformation of abstract visual images. Visuospatial abilities can be distinguished in sub-factors as spatial perception, spatial visualisation, and mental rotation and measured with specific tasks.
- Spatial-related inclinations: i.e., the preferences self-reported (using questionnaires) related to spatial and environment information and settings such as spatial anxiety, sense of direction (personal evaluation of one’s ability to orient and locate oneself within an environment), survey and route preference (also called orientation and route strategies; people’s preferred way to represent the environment in map-like or person point of view, pleasure of exploring (individuals who enjoy exploration) and spatial self-efficacy (the belief to be able to accomplish a spatial task).

Experimental, correlational and case study approaches are used to find patterns in individual differences. Correlations approach is based on a modality to understand individual differences in navigation and wayfinding abilities to compare groups or examining the relation between variables at the continuous level. Experimental approach examines the causality of the relationship between variables. It manipulates one variable (independent variable) and investigates the impact on environment recall (dependent variable). Case studies approach is used to understand to what extent a particular profile is related to spatial representation and associated features such as, cases of brain lesions or degenerative diseases (involving brain structures and network of cognitive map) or cases of cognitive and behavioural difficulties in acquiring environment information in absence of brain deficits (as in the case of developmental topographical disorientation).

== Evidence ==
Evidence shows there is a link between small scale spatial abilities and large scale spatial abilities. More specifically, there is a relation between visuospatial abilities (small scale abilities) with wayfinding attitudes (spatial self evaluation on large scale) on one’s ability to create a mental representation of the environment, or environment representation (large scale abilities).

Evidence presented in this section will focus on the research findings of correlational studies. Correlational studies between variables at a continuous level aim to test the degree to which small-scale visuospatial cognitive abilities and large-scale abilities are related.

=== Correlational approach ===
Moreover, correlational studies are also based on comparing groups on individual differences of navigation and are wayfinding related. This may involve comparing the extreme scores of individual differences of participants (high vs low self reports in wayfinding attitude, high vs low small-scale abilities) and examining the difference in spatial and environment learning. Or comparing the extreme high and low performance (after an environment learning task, high or low) and examining the difference in small-scale spatial abilities and wayfinding attitudes.

Concerning the correlational studies at continuous level a pioneering study was made by Allen et al. (1996). They asked participants to take a stroll in a small city. The authors measured recall performance and assessed visuospatial (small scale) abilities. Visuospatial abilities were measured by assessing spatial visualization, mental rotation and spatial memory tasks. The structural equation model showed that spatial sequential memory serves as a mediator in the relationship between the visuospatial ability factor and environmental knowledge

Further, Hegarthy et al., (2006) asked participants to learn a path in a real, virtual, and videotaped environment. After the learning phase, they were asked to estimate the distance and direction of certain landmarks in the environment. Participants performed a battery of verbal and spatial tasks.

Using a structural equation model, results indicate that sense of direction and spatial ability factors are related; and that both factors are linked to verbal ability. However, verbal ability does not predict environment (navigation) learning. Instead, both spatial ability and sense of direction predict environmental learning, sense of direction predicts direct experience, and visuospatial ability shares a strong link to visual learning (both virtual and videotaped). Both correlational studies showed the relation between small scale spatial abilities with large scale spatial abilities (examined with navigation learning). Allen et al., (1996) suggests that the relation between these variables is mediated. A confirmation that the relation between small scale spatial abilities with large scale spatial abilities can be mediated is shown by other evidence. For instance Meneghetti et al., (2016) showed that mental rotation abilities (small scale ability) are related to environment learning (path virtually acquired – a reproduction of large scale ability-) by the mediation of visuospatial working memory (i.e. the ability to process and maintain temporary visuospatial information).

=== Group comparison ===
An example of group comparison based on individual preferences is offered by Pazzaglia & Taylor (2007). They selected individuals with high and low preferences survey preference (i.e. preference to form a mental map) to examine the difference in performance in environment learning (by several task). The results showed that high survey group made better performance, especially less navigation errors, than low survey group.

An example of group comparison based on spatial environment performance is offered by Weisberg et al. (2014). They asked participants to learn paths in a virtual environment. They were tested for their visuospatial abilities (small scale) and wayfinding preferences. Then, they performed pointing performance (within and between routes) and model building. The results showed that participants making good pointing performance (between and within the paths) showed high visuospatial abilities (mental rotation) and wayfinding preferences (sense of direction).

=== Gender differences ===
Gender is a source of individual differences in navigation and wayfinding. Men show more confidence during navigation in comparison to women and in the final environment representation accuracy even the gender difference can be attenuated by some factors (as outcome variables, feedback, familiarity).

Females experience higher levels of spatial anxiety than men. Further two different wayfinding strategies are used by men and women: women prefer to use route strategy more, whilst men use survey (orientation) strategy more. Route strategy is related to following directional instructions, whilst survey (orientation) strategy is the use of references in the environment in relation to their position.

Examining relations at the continuous level, gender is a predictor that can influence navigation success - both males and females can perform successfully. However, the ability to form mental representations of new environments after navigation is impacted by different patterns of relations involving strategy, beliefs/self-efficacy and visuospatial cognitive abilities. Therefore, both males and females involve the use of visuospatial individual factors, abilities and inclinations, that with different patterns of relations influence navigation and wayfinding performance.

=== Age differences ===
In case of older adults, abilities in the spatial domain decrease. However, this is a generalization that can be error-prone. Indeed, it is necessary to consider what kind of spatial ability we are considering, whether it is small scale, large scale spatial ability, or the spatial self-evaluations (as wayfinding attitudes), and how these variables are related to each other. Moreover, some other factors that decline with aging could also impact spatial abilities, such as memory functions, executive control, and other cognitive factors.

Small-scale abilities, such as mental rotation, spatial visualization, spatial perception, and perspective taking decline. Even the course of decreasing is related to the type of abilities, task features, and other individual differences (such as gender and expertise in these abilities). In general, the abilities decline around 60, and can start as early as 50 in perspective taking.

Concerning wayfinding attitudes, generally self-reported ones, evidence suggests that they tend to be quite stable across the lifespan, such as sense of direction, with some changes such as the light increase of spatial anxiety.

Spatial learning and representation abilities also tend to decrease with age. Differences between young and older adults are related to several factors, both at the individual and at the environmental level. In fact, older adults are more likely to decline in spatial tasks based on allocentric knowledge (self-to object relations) with respect to egocentric knowledge (self-to object relation). When the task requires to recognize information, there is less age difference with respect to when active recall is required. When the environment is familiar, it is less subject to gender differences with respect to young adults. In studies involving healthy adults aged 18–78, it was found that difficulty increased, particularly from age 70. Biological factors involved in the decline is the decreased activity of the hippocampus, the parahippocampal gyrus, and the retrosplenial cortex, resulting in difficulties in acquiring new spatial knowledge and applying them.

Despite the decline of spatial abilities (such as visuospatial working memory and rotation), both spatial abilities and wayfinding attitudes contribute to different extents to maintain spatial learning and navigation accuracy in elderly. Indeed studies with samples of older adults showed that despite the decline of spatial abilities (small-scale), the latter still have a functional role in environment learning. Other studies showed the positive role of wayfinding attitudes, such as pleasure in exploring places, in maintaining spatial learning accuracy. This is beneficial because spatial learning is crucial for elders’ security, and subsequently, their autonomy, an indicator of quality of life.

== See also ==
- Spatial ability
- Spatial contextual awareness
- Spatial memory
- Sense of direction
- Space mapping
