= Bilateral vestibulopathy =

Severe damage to both inner ears

Bilateral vestibulopathy results as the culmination of damage done to both inner ears. Bilateral vestibulopathy causes problems in hearing, balance, and motor coordination.

== Symptoms ==
Symptoms typically include imbalance and visual problems. Dark or unsure situations generally increase this imbalance. The imbalance is worse in the dark or in situations where footing is uncertain. Spinning vertigo is unusual. Oscillopsia, visual symptoms of bilateral vestibulopathy, occur only when the head is moving. For instance, when driving, a person with bilateral vestibulopathy may see very blurry objects. Oscillopsia is often common during walking. Transient visual blurring occurs with quick movements of the head.

== Diagnosis ==
A review of symptoms, a medical history, and a physical examination or vestibular tests in a rotary chair are needed to make the diagnosis. There are several different causes of bilateral vestibulopathy, including gentamicin toxicity, but the rotary chair test will determine the effects on both ears. Tests for syphilis, an antibody test for autoimmune inner ear disease or audiograms may also be important.

== Treatment ==
Treatment differs depending on the cause. Each cause has a different treatment, and may involve either medical treatment, surgery, or therapy. If serious damage has already been done, then the focus of treatment is upon avoidance of vestibular suppressants and ototoxins including medications. Vestibular rehabilitation is important. Physicians will try to keep the administration of drugs to a minimum.
