= Dyssynergia =

Disturbance of muscular coordination

Dyssynergia is any disturbance of muscular coordination, resulting in uncoordinated and abrupt movements. This is also an aspect of ataxia. It is typical for dyssynergic patients to split a movement into several smaller movements. Types of dyssynergia include Ramsay Hunt syndrome type 1, bladder sphincter dyssynergia, and anal sphincter dyssynergia.

Dyssynergia can be caused by disruption or damage between the cerebellum and the sacral spinal cord. Damage to the spinal cord can be caused by injury or acquired through hereditary means such as myelodysplasia. Other hereditary means of dyssynergia can be from multiple sclerosis and various manifestations of transverse myelitis.

In addition, most brain damage to the cerebellum will cause dyssynergia. The cerebellum is split into three separate parts: the archicerebellum (controls equilibrium and helps to move the eye, head and neck), midline vermis (helps to move lower body), and lateral hemisphere (control of arms and quick movements). Damage to any part of the cerebellum can cause a disconnect between nerve cells and muscles, causing impaired muscle coordination.

== Types ==
=== Ramsay Hunt syndrome type 1 ===
Ramsay Hunt syndrome type 1 is a rare, neurodegenerative disorder characterized by myoclonus, intention tremor, progressive ataxia and occasionally dementia.

=== Bladder sphincter dyssynergia ===
Bladder sphincter dyssynergia also known as detrusor sphincter dyssynergia is the decrease of detrusor (wall muscle of the bladder) pressure which causes unwanted urination. This is very common in spinal cord injuries and multiple sclerosis patients. There is a malfunction between the central nervous system, urinary sphincters, and detrusor muscles. A condition with similar symptoms but different causes is Pseudodyssynergia.

=== Anal sphincter dyssynergia ===
Anal sphincter dyssynergia also known as pelvic floor dyssynergia is the weakening of the pelvic floor or sphincters in the anus. The pelvic floor are the muscles that attach to the pelvis in the abdomen. Anal sphincter dyssynergia can be caused by obstructions, but mostly improper relaxing of the anal sphincters or pelvic floor muscle during defecation. Also if there is a decrease in intrarectal pressure defecation can occur.

== Diagnosis ==
=== Anal sphincter dyssynergia ===
Anal sphincter dyssynergia tends to be one of the most predicted diagnoses with a patient suffering from symptoms like chronic constipation and inability to control bowel movements. Diagnosis techniques for dyssynergia have been known to be expensive and aren’t commonly offered at some countrywide hospitals. Fortunately, there are still special tests and examinations that can be done given the proper medical care and treatment to properly detect and diagnose dyssynergia. Those following treatments include: anorectal manometry (balloon expulsion test and anal sphincter EMG), defecography studies, and digital rectal examinations (DRE).

==== Anorectal manometry ====
Anorectal manometry involves two separate tests: the balloon expulsion test and anal sphincter electromyography (EMG). These tests are performed in order to properly identify and diagnose dyssynergia. In order to prepare for these tests, a patient must fast and perform specific enemas recommended by their doctor two hours before their tests. When undergoing the balloon expulsion test, the patient has a small balloon inserted into their rectum, which is then inflated and filled with water. The patient is then instructed to go to the nearest bathroom and to attempt to defecate the balloon, where the time it takes is recorded by the doctors. An abnormal or prolonged time of expulsion of the balloon is seen as a problem in the anorectum region of the body and may lead to the diagnosis of dyssynergia, since the patient has a lack of control over their anorectal muscle contractions. Another technique used by doctors to test for dyssynergia is the anal sphincter EMG. This test involves the insertion of an electrode into the patient’s anal cavity, where they are asked to relax and push, as if they are trying to defecate. The electrical activity and contractile pressures of the patient’s anorectal contractions are recorded on a computer monitor and examined by the doctor. If the electrical activity of the contractions appear normal, but the patient still results in constipation, it would indicate that there is a problem in the muscle activity or that there might be a tear in the muscle. This can help lead to a diagnosis of dyssynergia or an alternative surgical cure.

==== Defecography studies ====
In defecography studies, doctors take an X-Ray of the patient and examine their rectum as it empties during defecation. Before the examination, patients are instructed to drink barium an hour before the examination. Barium paste is then inserted into the rectal and anal cavity, and for female patients X-Ray dye is placed on the urinary bladder and in the vagina. The barium is used so that the digestive tract, such as the intestines, rectal cavity, and anal cavity can be seen clearly on the X-Ray and the muscle movements can be examined by doctors.

==== Digital rectal examinations ====
During a digital rectal examinations (DRE), a doctor will wear a lubricated latex glove and gently insert one finger, or digit, into the patient’s anus to perform a physical examination of the lower pelvic regions. This test is traditionally used for men to check the prostate gland for any abnormal bumps or growths, and for women to check the uterus and ovaries. This test can help identify complications that may be causing abnormal bowel habits, which can help properly diagnose cases of dyssynergia.

== Treatment ==
=== Bladder sphincter dyssynergia ===
==== Medication ====
Alpha blockers have been studied when treating people with detrusor sphincter dyssynergia (DSD). Terazosin has shown no reduction in voiding pressures with people who have suffered from spinal cord injuries, while Tamsulosin was given to patients with MS and resulted in improvement of post void residual measurements. However, it is not advised to use alpha blockers due to the lack of data supporting their success. Anti-spasmodic medications have also been tested on people with DSD. Oral Baclofen has limited benefit in treating DSD because it has low permeability across the blood brain barrier.

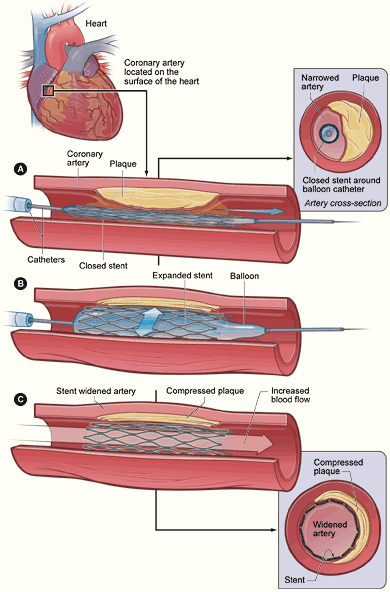
Diagram of coronary angioplasty and stent placement. Urethral stent is similar to that used in heart.

==== Catheterization ====
Intermittent catheters are used most frequently to treat DSD. The catheter is able to be inserted and removed from a person's bladder several times a day, so it is not permanently installed. This is to help people who struggle to empty their bladder. It is recommended that a person does not empty their bladder until a catheter is installed and stabilized. By having the catheter, the goal is to help reduce spasms within the sphincter. Ultrasound can be used to help track how effective the use of the catheter is. If a person struggles with using an intermittent catheter, than an indwelling catheter can be used instead. The indwelling has the same function, however it is designed to remain in the bladder.

==== Botox ====
Botulinum A Toxin (BTX A) is injected into the external sphincter via cystoscopic or ultrasound. Botox blocks the release of acetylcholine, a neurotransmitter that is needed for muscle contraction. With the release of acetylcholine inhibited, muscles will become more relaxed.

==== Urethral stents ====
Urethral stents are thin wires that are placed within the urethra to either treat or prevent obstruction of urine flowing from the kidney. The stents can either be placed temporarily or permanently.

==== Sphincterotomy ====
Sphincterotomy is the most invasive treatment to use when treating DSD. The purpose of the treatment is to create a low pressure within the bladder as well as impair the external sphincter. Electrocautery is used to cut out the external sphincter, which can result in a lot of bleeding. A catheter is then used to help relieve pressure that can occur.

== See also ==
- Synergy
