= Idiothetic =

Term in navigation research

Idiothetic literally means "self-proposition" (Greek derivation), and is used in navigation models (e.g., of a rat in a maze) to describe the use of self-motion cues, rather than allothetic, or external, cues such as landmarks, to determine position and movement. The word is sometimes also spelled "ideothetic" (e.g., Chen et al, 1994). Idiothetic cues include vestibular, optic flow and proprioception. Idiothetic cues are important for the type of navigation known as path integration in which subjects navigate purely using such self-motion cues. This is achieved by an animal through the signals generated by angular and linear accelerations in the course of its exploration. This information generates and updates a vector towards the starting point and an accurate path for return. The spider Cupiennius salei has been known to possess this idiothetic orientation, demonstrating its higher cognitive abilities.

The term idiothetic is also used in robotics and in personality psychology. Idiothetic psychology of personality suggests that personality description follows idiographic principles, while personality development centres around nomothetic principles. Idiothetic-based psychological theories include James Lamiell's Critical Personalism model, George Kelly's Role Repertory Test, and the narrative approaches that focus on the impact of life stories.

== See also ==
- Dead reckoning
- Navigation research
- Neuroscience
- Robotic mapping
