= International Cooperative Ataxia Rating Scale =

- Purpose: quantification of impairment due to cerebellar ataxia

The International Cooperative Ataxia Rating Scale (ICARS) is an outcome measure that was created in 1997 by the Committee of the World Federation of Neurology with the goal of standardizing the quantification of impairment due to cerebellar ataxia. The scale is scored out of 100 with 19 items and 4 subscales of postural and gait disturbances, limb ataxia, dysarthria, and oculomotor disorders. Higher scores indicate higher levels of impairment.

Subscale	Items	Weight
Postural and gait disturbances	7	34 (12 for gait, 22 for stance)
Limb ataxia	7	52
Dysarthria	2	8
Oculomotor disorders	3	6

The ICARS has been validated for use in patients with focal cerebellar lesions and hereditary spinocerebellar and Friedrich's ataxia. More recently, two shorter ataxia scales based upon the ICARS have been created and validated, the Scale for the Assessment and Rating of Ataxia (SARA) and the Brief Ataxia Rating Scale (BARS). The SARA is a shorter, 8 item, 40 point scale which has been validated in ataxia patients. The BARS was developed in 2009 in an attempt to both reduce redundancies of the ICARS, but also to shorten and simplify the administration of ataxia outcome measures.
