= Autoimmune inner ear disease =

- Other names: AIED, Ménière's disease
- Cochlea, which is affected by this condition
- Specialty: Audiology, immunology

Autoimmune inner ear disease (AIED) was first defined by Dr. Brian McCabe in a landmark paper describing an autoimmune loss of hearing. The disease results in progressive sensorineural hearing loss (SNHL) that acts bilaterally and asymmetrically, and sometimes affects an individual's vestibular system. AIED is used to describe any disorder in which the inner ear is damaged as a result of an autoimmune response. Some examples of autoimmune disorders that have presented with AIED are Cogan's syndrome, relapsing polychondritis, systemic lupus erythematosus, granulomatosis with polyangiitis, polyarteritis nodosa, Sjogren's syndrome, and Lyme disease.

Research has come to the consensus that AIED is the result of antibodies or other immune cells that cause damage to structures of the inner ear such as the cochlea and vestibular system. Of note, AIED is the only known SNHL that responds to medical treatment, but withholding treatment for longer than three months may result in permanent hearing loss and the need for cochlear implant installation.

Although AIED has been studied extensively over the past 25 years, no clear mechanism of pathogenesis has emerged. A recent paper performed a literature review of all relevant articles dating back to 1980, and proposed a mechanism of pathogenesis which includes an inflammatory response and immune cell attack on inner ear structures. This response leads to an over-activation of other immune cells such as T helper cells, resulting in vascular changes and cochlear harm. AIED appears to be a consequence of damaged sensorineural hearing due to electrochemical disturbances, microthrombosis, and immune cell deposition. Additionally, self-reactive antibodies and T-cells contribute to the aforementioned damage. Research has suggested a valuable next step in uncovering AIED pathogenesis is inquiry into the role of interleukin-1β (IL-1β).

== Signs and symptoms ==
Signs and symptoms of AIED are:

- Progressive hearing loss in both ears
  - Typically will begin in one ear and gradually affect the other
  - Hearing loss may begin suddenly
- Tinnitus (ringing or buzzing in ears)
- Decrease in word recognition capability
- Loss of balance (vestibular symptoms)
  - Degree of balance loss can change throughout the course of the disease
- Ataxia (loss of coordination of voluntary muscles)

== Causes ==
AIED is generally caused by either antibodies or immune cells that cause damage to the inner ear. There are several theories that propose a cause of AIED:

- Bystander damage – Physical damage to the inner ear may lead to cytokine release that signals for an immune response. This may be a component of the "attack/remission cycle" of AIED.
- Cross-reactions – Accidental damage of the inner ear by antibodies or T-cells that recognize an inner ear antigen that is similar to a bacterial or viral antigen
- Genetic factors – Predisposition to developing an autoimmune disorder based on genes inherited
- Intolerance – The immune system may not be aware of all the antigens present in the inner ear until physical damage releases some of these antigens. As a result, the immune system treats these unfamiliar antigens as foreign and mounts an immune response.

Currently, the cross-reactions theory appears to be the favored mechanism of AIED pathogenesis.

== Diagnosis ==
Since AIED symptoms are fairly common to many hearing loss disorders, it may be difficult to diagnose AIED without performing multiple medical tests. Some examples of these tests include:

- Hearing Tests for Progressive Hearing and Balance loss
  - Audiometry (measure of hearing acuity and sound intensity)
  - Rotatory Chair Test (determines if inner ear is responsible for balance loss)
  - Electrocochleography (ECOG) (recording of electrical potential in inner ear due to sound)
- Blood Tests for General Autoimmune Diseases
  - Erythrocyte sedimentation rate (test for inflammation)
  - Rheumatoid Factor (indicator of autoimmune disorders)

There are also blood tests specific to inner ear disorders:

- Anti-cochlear antibody test (testing for antibodies against cochlear cells)
- Lymphocyte Transformation Assay (testing whether an individual has developed a T-cell response against a certain drug)

Though it has also been proposed that the use of anti heat shock protein 70 antibodies may be useful in the detection and diagnosis of AIED, there is not enough evidence to confirm the reliability of this method.

== Treatment ==
AIED treatment is a rapidly changing field. Several medical therapies have been proposed in the treatment of AIED, with corticosteroid therapy being the most effective. However, corticosteroid therapy (specifically with prednisone and dexamethasone) has demonstrated limited effectiveness in some patients, suggesting the need for novel treatment methods. The goal of most AIED treatments is to administer corticosteroids over a certain period of time, re-evaluate hearing at each appointment, and eventually taper off corticosteroid administration. Ideally, patients can be tapered off with hearing fully recovered, though this is the least likely outcome. More recent data indicates that patients with shorter duration of hearing loss prior to immunosuppressive treatment and lower baseline hearing thresholds are significantly more likely to demonstrate hearing improvement following first-line corticosteroid therapy. Often, tumor necrosis factor-α (TNF-α) inhibitors must be administered alongside corticosteroids to achieve a favorable outcome and eventual end to corticosteroid treatment. Recent papers have indicated that the TNF-α inhibitor, infliximab, has the potential to allow for sustained patient improvement and alleviation of symptoms.

Cytotoxic agents such as cyclophosphamide and methotrexate have been used in AIED treatment in the past; however, findings have suggested limited symptom alleviation from these drugs.
