= Allothetic =

Centred in people or places other than oneself

Allothetic means being centred in people or places other than oneself. It has been defined as a process of "determining and maintaining a course or trajectory from one place to another. It can be used as a navigational strategy among animals to aid in their survival. It can also be a source of information for machines, particularly those biologically-inspired models and is provided by a set of laser rangefinders, sonars, or vision.

Allothetic is used in navigation models (e.g., of a rat in a maze) as in the phrase "allothetic map" to indicate that a global map, not orientated or centred on the subject was used, rather than idiothetic, which means a navigation system centred on the subject. Directional information may be sourced from familiar reference points such as the sun, stars, or the Earth's magnetic field. Allothetic cues are often employed with idiothetic information to achieve spatial behavior. Their characteristics are complementary such as the way the latter can help address the allothetic information's perceptual aliasing problem, which prevents an animal or a robot from distinguishing two places from each other.

== Animal navigation ==
Animals can obtain the so-called pure allothetic navigation once they become familiar with fixed objects at specific locations. Relationships among these objects, particularly permanent and semi-permanent objects, are also critical in guiding the animals' movements. These objects need to be asymmetrical otherwise they will not contain identifiable information about direction. Allothetic navigation in rats uses external cues such as visual, auditory, or olfactory information to help them in foraging resources or for protection against predators.

== Robot navigation ==
Robot navigation relies on allothetic, and idiothetic information to determine the robot's position in its environment.

== See also ==
- Navigation research
- Allocentrism
