= Fronto-cerebellar dissociation =

Animation of the frontal lobe, shown in red

Fronto-cerebellar dissociation is the disconnection and independent function of frontal and cerebellar regions of the brain. It is characterized by inhibited communication between the two regions, and is notably observed in cases of ADHD, schizophrenia, alcohol use disorder, and heroin use. The frontal and cerebellar regions make distinctive contributions to cognitive performance, with the left-frontal activations being responsible for selecting a response to a stimulus, while the right-cerebellar activation is responsible for the search for a given response to a stimulus. Left-frontal activation increases when there are many appropriate responses to a stimulus, and right-cerebellar activation increases when there is a single appropriate response to a stimulus. A person with dissociated frontal and cerebellar regions may have difficulties with selecting a response to a stimuli, or difficulties with response initiation. Fronto-cerebellar dissociation can often result in either the frontal lobe or the cerebellum becoming more active in place of the less active region as a compensatory effect.

== Background ==
Animation of the cerebellum, shown in red

Neuroanatomical studies in non-human primates have shown connections between the cerebellum and non-motor cortical areas of the frontal lobe. Fronto-cerebellar circuitry is important to processes such as language, memory, and thought. Positron emission tomography has shown that when a subject was shown a noun and asked to state an associated verb, left-frontal and right-cerebellar activation was greater than if asked to simply speak the noun aloud. Generating an associated word required more fronto-cerebellar coactivation, indicating a difference between semantic retrieval and verbal working memory. Additionally, completing a word when presented a stem of the word resulted in greater left-frontal activation when there were many possible completions to the stem. Right-cerebellar activation was greater when there were fewer possible completions to the stem. These results indicate that the left-frontal activations correlate with selection of a response among many possible responses.

== Pathways ==
Two distinct fronto-cerebellar pathways have been identified through evoking and measuring field potentials on the cerebellar surface of rats. The first path originates from the PrL (prelimbic) sub-region of the mPFC (medial prefrontal cortex), and the second originates from the M2 region (premotor cortex). The path from the PrL cortex was found to be 5 milliseconds slower than the path from the M2 cortex. This difference in speed was part of the evidence supporting the idea of two pathways from independent origins. In addition, larger amplitude responses were recorded during PrL stimulation, further supporting that the pathways were separate.

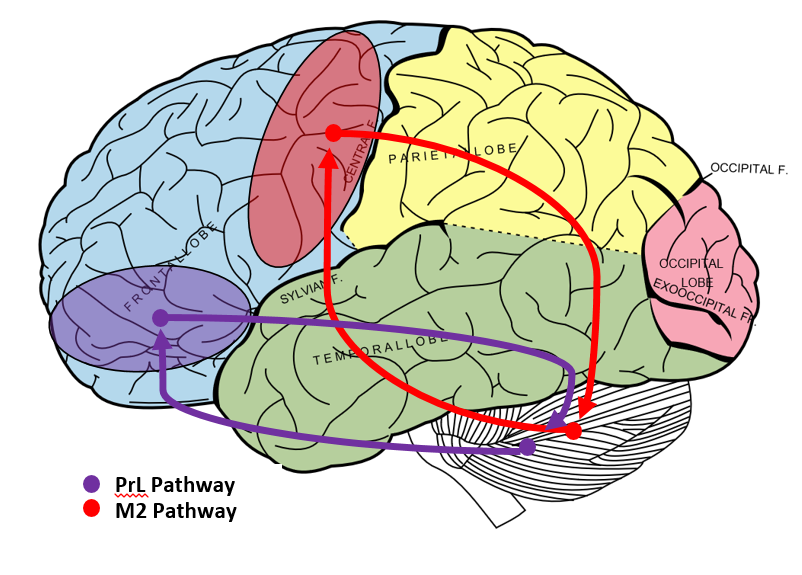
The M2 pathway is shown in red, originating in the pre-motor cortex. The PrL pathway is shown in purple, originating in the medial prefrontal cortex

The PrL cortex and M2 cortex are involved in actions such as eyeblink conditioning, action initiation and termination, conflict-monitoring between automatic and voluntary behavioral strategies, attention, and direct and indirect eye movement control. They are also involved in even higher cognitive functions such as stimulus-outcome encoding and automatization of recurrent actions.

== Related conditions ==
=== Alcohol use disorder ===
There is a reduction in functional neurological connectivity in alcohol dependent subjects, specific to the fronto-cerebellar circuits. Similar dissociation is not seen between prefrontal and premotor cortex, nor between parietal cortex and cerebellum, nor between temporal cortex and cerebellum in people who drink excessive amounts of alcohol. In alcoholic subjects, there is often decreased glucose metabolic rates in the frontal lobe, irregular glucose metabolism in frontal, parietal, and cerebellar regions, irregular concentrations of N-acetyl-aspartate and choline in the cerebellum, and abnormal grey matter volume in the nodes of fronto-cerebellar circuits.

=== Heroin abuse ===
Studies indicate reorganization of fronto-cerebellar circuitry and fronto-cerebellar dysfunction among heroin addicted subjects. In task related fMRI, addicts showed an inverse correlation between cerebellum activation and prefrontal cortex activity. This indicates that when chronic use damages the prefrontal cortex, the importance of the cerebellum to external incentive stimuli increases. This drug-induced damage of fronto-cerebellar circuitry may result in the cerebellum taking a larger role in long-term emotional memory, behavioral sensitization, and inflexible behavior.

=== ADHD ===
In healthy individuals, fronto-cerebellar neural networks mediate selective and sustained attention. Children and adults with Attention Deficit Hyperactivity Disorder (ADHD) show reduced functional connectivity relative to healthy controls in fronto-cerebellar networks. Such dissociation is correlated with the characteristic functions of ADHD such as set-shifting and set maintenance, higher level and selective attention, interference control, motor inhibition, integration across space and time, planning, decision making, temporal foresight, and working memory. In individuals with ADHD, there is often increased cerebellar activity due to a compensatory effect related to reduced frontal activity.

=== Schizophrenia ===
Fronto-cerebellar dissociation has been associated with higher cognitive defects in individuals with schizophrenia. Behaviors such as anhedonia, the inability to experience pleasure from activities usually found enjoyable, and ambivalence, the state of having simultaneous, conflicting feelings toward a person or thing, are both attributed to fronto-cerebellar abnormalities in schizophrenic patients. When healthy adults undergo infant motor development, it is characterized by increased grey matter density in the fronto-cerebellar pathways. Schizophrenic individuals often have delayed motor development, resulting in fronto-cerebellar abnormalities and decreased executive function in adulthood as a result.
