= Vestibulopathy =

Disorder of the inner ear

Vestibulopathies are disorders of the inner ear. They may include bilateral vestibulopathy, central vestibulopathy, post traumatic vestibulopathy, peripheral vestibulopathy, recurrent vestibulopathy, visual vestibulopathy, and neurotoxic vestibulopathy, among others.

Tinnitus is a common vestibulopathy. Migraines have often been associated with vestibulopathies. Ménière's disease, which is strongly associated to vestibulopathy, is considered to be "a challenging and relentless disorder."
