= Dysmetria =

Medical condition affecting movement coordination

- Specialty: Neurology

Dysmetria (English: from Greek 'dys' meaning bad or difficult, and 'metron' meaning measure) is a lack of coordination of movement typified by the undershoot or overshoot of intended position with the hand, arm, leg, or eye. It is a type of ataxia. It can also include an inability to judge distance or scale.

Hypermetria and hypometria are, respectively, overshooting and undershooting the intended position.

== Presentation ==
=== Associated diseases ===
Dysmetria is often found in individuals with multiple sclerosis (MS), amyotrophic lateral sclerosis (ALS), and persons who have had tumors or strokes. Persons who have been diagnosed with autosomal dominant spinocerebellar ataxia (SCAs) also exhibit dysmetria. There are many types of SCAs and though many exhibit similar symptoms (one being dysmetria), they are considered to be heterogeneous. Friedreich's ataxia is a relatively common cause of dysmetria. Cerebellar malformations extending to the brainstem can also present with dysmetria.

== Causes ==
The actual cause of dysmetria is thought to be caused by lesions in the cerebellum or by lesions in the proprioceptive nerves that lead to the cerebellum that coordinate visual, spatial and other sensory information with motor control. Damage to the proprioceptive nerves does not allow the cerebellum to accurately judge where the hand, arm, leg, or eye should move. These lesions are often caused by strokes, multiple sclerosis (MS), amyotrophic lateral sclerosis (ALS), or tumors.

According to the research article cited above, motor control is a learning process that utilizes APPGs. Disruption of APPGs is possibly the cause of ataxia and dysmetria and upon identification of the motor primitives, clinicians may be able to isolate the specific areas responsible for the cerebellar problems.

There are two types of cerebellar disorders that produce dysmetria, specifically midline cerebellar syndromes and hemispheric cerebellar syndromes. Midline cerebellar syndromes can cause ocular dysmetria, a condition in which the eyes can not track an object properly and either overshoot (ahead of the object )or undershoot (lagging behind the object). Ocular dysmetria also makes it difficult to maintain fixation on a stationary object. Hemispheric cerebellar syndromes cause dysmetria in the typical motor sense that many think of when hearing the term dysmetria.

A common motor syndrome that causes dysmetria is cerebellar motor syndrome, which also marked by impairments in gait (also known as ataxia), disordered eye movements, tremor, difficulty swallowing and poor articulation. As stated above, cerebellar cognitive affective syndrome (CCAS) also causes dysmetria.

== Anatomy ==
The cerebellum is the area of the brain that contributes to coordination and motor processes and is anatomically inferior to the cerebrum. Sensorimotor integration is the brain's way of integrating the information received from the sensory (or proprioceptive) neurons from the body, including any visual information. To be more specific, information needed to perform a motor task comes from retinal information pertaining to the eyes' position and has to be translated into spatial information. Sensorimotor integration is crucial for performing any motor task and takes place in the post parietal cortex. After the visual information has been translated into spatial information, the cerebellum must use this information to perform the motor task. If there is damage to any pathways that connect the pathways, dysmetria may result.

=== Motor ===
Motor dysmetria is the customary term used when a person refers to dysmetria. Dysmetria of the extremities caused by hemispheric syndromes is manifested in multiple ways: dysrhythmic tapping of hands and feet and dysdiadochokinesis, which is the impairment of alternating movements. Damage to the cerebellum makes a person slow to orient their extremities in space.

Motor control as a learning process

Recent research has also shed light upon a specific process that if interrupted, may be the cause of ataxia and dysmetria. According to sources cited in this article, motor control is a learning process that occurs in the synapses of Purkinje dendrites. There have been varying theories as to the makeup of the cerebellum, which controls this process. Some predicted that the cerebellum was an array of adjustable pattern generators (APGs), each of which generate a "burst command" with varying intensity and duration. Other models, which apply mostly in robotic applications, propose that the cerebellum acquires an "inverse model of the motor apparatus". More recent research in electrophysiology has shown modular structures in the spinal cord known as "motor primitives". Based on the APG model, modules of APG are the features that control motor learning. The entire process is a positive feedback loop. Inhibitory input is transmitted and received from various components of the cortex, including the cerebellar nucleus, a motor cortical cell and Purkinje cells. Purkinje cells send the inhibitive information by obtaining learning information from parallel fibers of granule cells. This model of APGs is useful in that it effectively describes the motor learning process.

Motor primitives are another proposed module of motor learning. This information was found by electrical stimulation of the lumbar spinal cord in rats and frogs. Upon the stimulation, researchers found that motor primitives are found in the spinal cord and use patterns of muscle activation to generate a specific motor output. Different movements are learned from different levels of activation. These findings led researchers to believe that these same motor primitives could be found in the cerebellum.

These two different models combined show that it is possible that motor primitives are in the cerebellum, because, "a set of parallel arrays of APG can drive each motor primitive module in the spinal cord." The authors have generated a model of adjustable primitive pattern generator (APPG), which is basically a group of parallel APGs summed together.

The APPG model is a vector sum of all the inputs of the APG, which are units of position, velocity and time. Granule cells send information from the spinal cord and the motor cortex which in turn translates the information in a process called state mapping. The final model of the APPG becomes linear upon the vector summation of the information from the neurons and muscles. This model is consistent with the "virtual trajectory hypothesis" which states that the desired trajectory is sent to the spinal cord as a motor command.

=== Saccadic ===
Saccades are the very quick, simultaneous movements made by the eye to receive visual information and shift the line of vision from one position to another. A person depends profoundly on the ability of the accuracy of these movements. The information is received from the retina, is translated into spatial information and is then transferred to motor centers for motor response. A person with saccadic dysmetria will constantly produce abnormal eye movements including microsaccades, ocular flutter, and square wave jerks even when the eye is at rest. During eye movements hypometric and hypermetric saccades will occur and interruption and slowing of normal saccadic movement is common.

== Diagnosis ==
Diagnosis of any cerebellar disorder or syndrome should be made by a qualified neurologist. Prior to referring a patient to a neurologist, a general practitioner or MS nurse will perform a finger-to-nose test. The clinician will raise a finger in front of the patient and ask him to touch it with his finger and then touch his nose with his forefinger several times. This shows a patient's ability to judge the position of a target. Other tests that could be performed are similar in nature and include a heel to shin test in which proximal overshoot characterizes dysmetria and an inability to draw an imaginary circle with the arms or legs without any decomposition of movement. After a positive result in the finger-to-nose test, a neurologist will do a magnetic resonance image (MRI) to determine any damage to the cerebellum.

Cerebellar patients encounter difficulties to adapt to unexpected changes of the inertia of the limbs. This can be used to increase dysmetria and confirm a diagnosis of cerebellar dysfunction. Patients also show an abnormal response to changes in damping. These findings confirm a role of the cerebellum in predictions.

== Treatments ==
Currently there is no cure for dysmetria itself as it is actually a symptom of an underlying disorder. However, isoniazid and clonazepam have been used to treat dysmetria. Frenkel exercises treat dysmetria.

=== Research ===
Researchers now are testing different possibilities for treating dysmetria and ataxia. One opportunity for treatment is called rehearsal by eye movement. It is believed that visually guided movements require both lower- and higher-order visual functioning by first identifying a target location and then moving to acquire what is sought after. In one study, researchers used visually guided stepping which is parallel to visually guided arm movements to test this treatment. The patients had saccadic dysmetria which in turn caused them to overshoot their movements 3. The patients first walked normally and were then told to twice review the area that was to be walked through 3. After rehearsal with eye movements, the patients improved their motor performance. Researchers believe that prior rehearsal with the eyes might be enough for a patient with motor dysmetria as a result of saccadic dysmetria to complete a motor task with enhanced spatial awareness.

Research has also been done for those patients with MS. Deep brain stimulation (DBS) remains a viable possibility for some MS patients though the long-term effects of this treatment are currently under review. The subjects who have undergone this treatment had no major relapse for six months and disabling motor function problems. Most subjects benefited from the implantation of the electrodes and some reported that their movement disorder was gone after surgery. However, these results are limiting at this time because of the small range of subjects who were used for the experiment and it is unknown whether this is a viable option for all MS patients with motor control problems.

== See also ==
- Intention tremor
- Ocular dysmetria
