= Dysdiadochokinesia =

- Other names: Dysdiadochokinesis, dysdiadokokinesia, dysdiadokokinesis
- Pronunciation: /ˌdɪsˌdaɪˌædəˌkoʊkaɪˈniːʒ(i)ə/
- Specialty: Neurology

Dysdiadochokinesia (DDK) is the medical term for an impaired ability to perform rapid, alternating movements (i.e., diadochokinesia). Complete inability is called adiadochokinesia. The term is from Greek δυς dys "bad", διάδοχος diadochos "working in turn", κίνησις kinesis "movement". The term was first described by neurologist Joseph Francois Félix Babinski in 1902. Impaired pronation/supination of the upper extremities, hand/finger tapping, and heel-to-shin test are some clinical ways to test for dysdiadochokinesia. Causes can either be from cerebellar or extrapyramidal origin. Management includes treating the underlying cause and neurorehabilitation therapies.

== History of name and origin ==
The term dysdiadochokinesia came into fruition in 1902 after the neurologist Joseph Francois Félix Babinski observed patients with cerebellar lesions. He noticed that these patients could not perform rapid, alternating movements of agonist and antagonist muscles. During this time period, neurophysiologists discovered that voluntary movements came from the cerebellum. The term has the Greek roots, "dys", "diadochos", "kinesis", meaning impaired, succeeding, and movement, respectively.

== Signs and symptoms ==
Abnormalities in dysdiadochokinesia can be seen in the upper extremity, lower extremity, and in speech. These deficits can greatly impact activities of daily living through motor movements. The deficits become visible in the rate of alternation, the completeness of the sequence, and in the variation in amplitude involving both motor coordination and sequencing. Average rate can be used as a measure of performance when testing for dysdiadochokinesia.

=== Clinical manifestations ===
- Reduced movement frequency: slowed movements
- Irregular rhythm: abnormal cycling of hands with variability
- Dysmetria: inaccurate targeting

=== Clinical testing ===
==== Limb testing ====
- Impaired pronation/supination of the upper extremities: reduced angular velocity with variability, patients are asked to tap the palm of one hand with the fingers of the other, then rapidly turn over the fingers and tap the palm with the back of them repeatedly
- Abnormal hand/finger tapping: finger-to-thumb tapping rapidly, can be done bilaterally
- Heel-to-shin test: rubbing the heel of one foot to the opposite shin in an up-and-down motion, the feet normally perform less well than the hands.

==== Oral testing ====
- Speech: the patient is asked to repeat syllables such as /pə/, /tə/, and /kə/; variation, excess loudness, and irregular articular breakdown are signs of dysdiadochokinesia

=== Quantifying tests ===
Most commonly, frequency of the tapping or motion is used to quantify deficits. It has been shown to be both sensitive and precise, while also being clinically simple to perform and grade. Further quantifying can be done with ultrasound, where it creates a three-dimensional picture. This resource can be used to quantify factors of dysdiadochokinesia like amplitude, velocity, and smoothness.

The cerebellum controls voluntary movements, while maintaining balance and posture.

== Causes ==
Dysdiadochokinesia is a feature of cerebellar ataxia and may be the result of lesions to either the cerebellar hemispheres or the frontal lobe (of the cerebrum), it can also be a combination of both. It is thought to be caused by the inability to switch on and switch off antagonising muscle groups in a coordinated fashion due to hypotonia, secondary to the central lesion.

=== Cerebellar causes ===
- Multiple system atrophy, cerebellar type
- Multiple sclerosis
- Cerebellar stroke
- Alcoholic cerebellar degeneration
- Hereditary ataxias such as Friedreich's ataxia

=== Extrapyramidal causes ===
- Parkinson's disease
- Huntington's disease
- Drug-induced parkinsonism

Dysdiadochokinesia has been linked to a mutation in SLC18A2, which encodes vesicular monoamine transporter 2(VMAT2).

== Management ==
Treatment is focused on the underlying source or condition. There is not an established pharmacological treatment specifically for cerebellar symptoms. The main focus is on neurorehabilitation, where the patient is enrolled in occupational, speech, and physical therapies.

=== Occupational therapy ===
Focus is put on limb grasping and gripping, which in turn help with tasks like turning a doorknob or buttoning up a shirt. Patients also learn how to transfer themselves safely, learning safe techniques to help them to get from a chair to the bed, for example.

=== Speech therapy ===
To help with irregular flow and impaired articulation with motor speech difficulties, patients practice speech rate and rhythm. Although speech therapy is strongly recommended, further research is needed to quantify its effectiveness.

=== Physical therapy ===
Patients focus on task-specific goals, like climbing a flight of stairs or walking across the living room. Emphasis is put on high-intensity coordination, where movements are repeated for practice. Structured physical therapy programs help patients focus on balance and coordination by improving gait and limb swinging.
