= Polymerase proofreading-associated polyposis =

- Other names: PPAP
- Specialty: Medical genetics, gastroenterology
- Symptoms: Asymptomatic, often develop multiple colorectal adenomas
- Complications: Colorectal, duodenal, & endometrial cancer
- Diagnostic method: Colonoscopy
- Differential diagnosis: Familial adenomatous polyposis, MUTYH-associated polyposis
- Treatment: Colonoscopy; Polypectomy
- Frequency: Rare

Polymerase proofreading-associated polyposis (PPAP) is an autosomal dominant hereditary cancer syndrome, which is characterized by numerous polyps in the colon and an increased risk of colorectal cancer. It is caused by germline mutations in DNA polymerase ε (POLE) and δ (POLD1). Affected individuals develop numerous polyps called colorectal adenomas. Compared with other polyposis syndromes, Polymerase proofreading-associated polyposis is rare. Genetic testing can help exclude similar syndromes, such as Familial adenomatous polyposis and MUTYH-associated polyposis. Endometrial cancer, duodenal polyps and duodenal cancer may also occur.

== Genetics ==
PPAP is an autosomal dominant syndrome caused by germline mutations in DNA polymerase ε (POLE) and δ (POLD1). The penetrance of the condition appears high.
