= AFAP =

AFAP may refer to:

- Actin filament-associated protein
- Attenuated familial adenomatous polyposis
- Australian Federation of Air Pilots
- Internet slang for as far as possible
- W79 Artillery-Fired Atomic Projectile, or similar nuclear artillery projectiles
