= Replication protein A2 =

Protein found in humans

RPA2
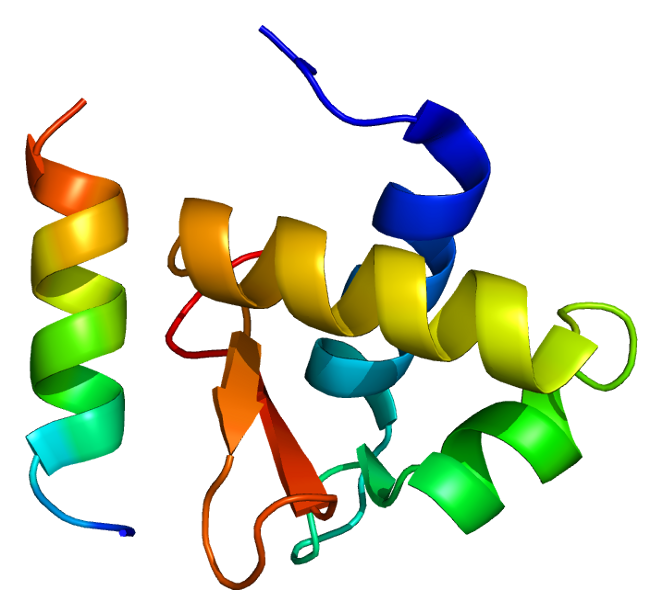

Identifiers
- Aliases: RPA2, REPA2, RP-A p32, RP-A p34, RPA32, replication protein A2
- External IDs: OMIM: 179836; MGI: 1339939; GeneCards: RPA2
Available structures
PDB	Ortholog search: PDBe RCSB
PDB	List of PDB id codes 1DPU, 1L1O, 1QUQ, 1Z1D, 2PI2, 2PQA, 2Z6K, 3KDF, 4MQV, 4OU0

Gene location (Human)
Chr.	Chromosome 1 (human)
Band	1p35.3	Start	27,891,524 bp
Band	1p35.3	End	27,914,746 bp

Gene location (Mouse)
Chr.	Chromosome 4 (mouse)
Band	4|4 D2.3	Start	132,495,643 bp
Band	4|4 D2.3	End	132,506,063 bp
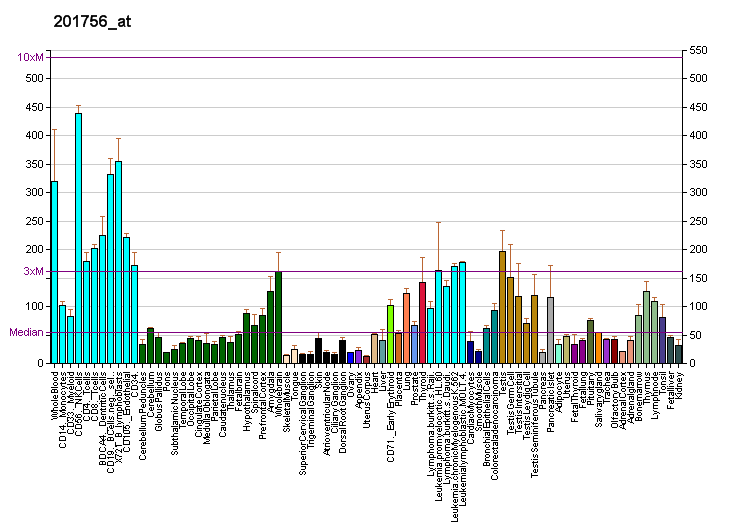
RNA expression pattern
Bgee	Human / Mouse (ortholog); Top expressed in: ventricular zone; granulocyte; ganglionic eminence; right testis; left testis; gastrocnemius muscle; Achilles tendon; right uterine tube; gonad; tibialis anterior muscle / Top expressed in: somite; fetal liver hematopoietic progenitor cell; primitive streak; embryo; ventricular zone; mandibular prominence; endocardial cushion; abdominal wall; germ layer; ectoderm; More reference expression data
BioGPS	More reference expression data
Gene ontology
Molecular function	DNA binding; protein N-terminus binding; single-stranded DNA binding; damaged DNA binding; protein binding; enzyme binding; protein phosphatase binding; ubiquitin protein ligase binding; G-rich strand telomeric DNA binding; double-stranded DNA binding; sequence-specific DNA binding
Cellular component	site of double-strand break; PML body; nucleoplasm; telomere; DNA replication factor A complex; chromatin; nucleus; nuclear body; condensed nuclear chromosome
Biological process	nucleotide-excision repair, DNA gap filling; DNA recombination; interstrand cross-link repair; regulation of double-strand break repair via homologous recombination; error-free translesion synthesis; G1 phase; error-prone translesion synthesis; cellular response to DNA damage stimulus; DNA replication; mitotic G1 DNA damage checkpoint signaling; regulation of DNA damage checkpoint; regulation of cellular response to heat; DNA mismatch repair; translesion synthesis; transcription-coupled nucleotide-excision repair; nucleotide-excision repair, DNA incision; base-excision repair; nucleotide-excision repair; nucleotide-excision repair, preincision complex stabilization; regulation of signal transduction by p53 class mediator; DNA repair; double-strand break repair via homologous recombination; nucleotide-excision repair, preincision complex assembly; nucleotide-excision repair, DNA incision, 5'-to lesion; nucleotide-excision repair, DNA incision, 3'-to lesion; protein localization to chromosome; telomere maintenance; telomere maintenance via semi-conservative replication; G1/S transition of mitotic cell cycle; telomere maintenance via recombination; DNA topological change; DNA unwinding involved in DNA replication; mitotic recombination; telomere maintenance via telomerase; reciprocal meiotic recombination; heteroduplex formation; positive regulation of helicase activity
Sources:Amigo / QuickGO
Orthologs
Databases	NCBI: entry; OMA: entry
Species	Human	Mouse
Entrez	6118	19891
Ensembl	ENSG00000117748	ENSMUSG00000028884
UniProt	P15927	Q62193
RefSeq (mRNA)	NM_001286076; NM_001297558; NM_002946; NM_001355128; NM_001355129	NM_011284
RefSeq (protein)	NP_001273005; NP_001284487; NP_002937; NP_001342057; NP_001342058	n/a
Location (UCSC)	Chr 1: 27.89 – 27.91 Mb	Chr 4: 132.5 – 132.51 Mb
PubMed search
- Wikidata
View/Edit Human	View/Edit Mouse

Replication protein A 32 kDa subunit is a protein that in humans is encoded by the RPA2 gene.

== Interactions ==
RPA2 has been shown to interact with:

- Cyclin O,
- DNA-PKcs,
- Ku70,
- MEN1,
- RPA3,
- Replication protein A1,
- STAT3,
- TP53BP1 and
- Uracil-DNA glycosylase.

== See also ==
- Single-stranded binding protein
- Replication protein A
- Replication protein A1
- Replication protein A3
