= Replication protein A3 =

Protein-coding gene in the species Homo sapiens

RPA3
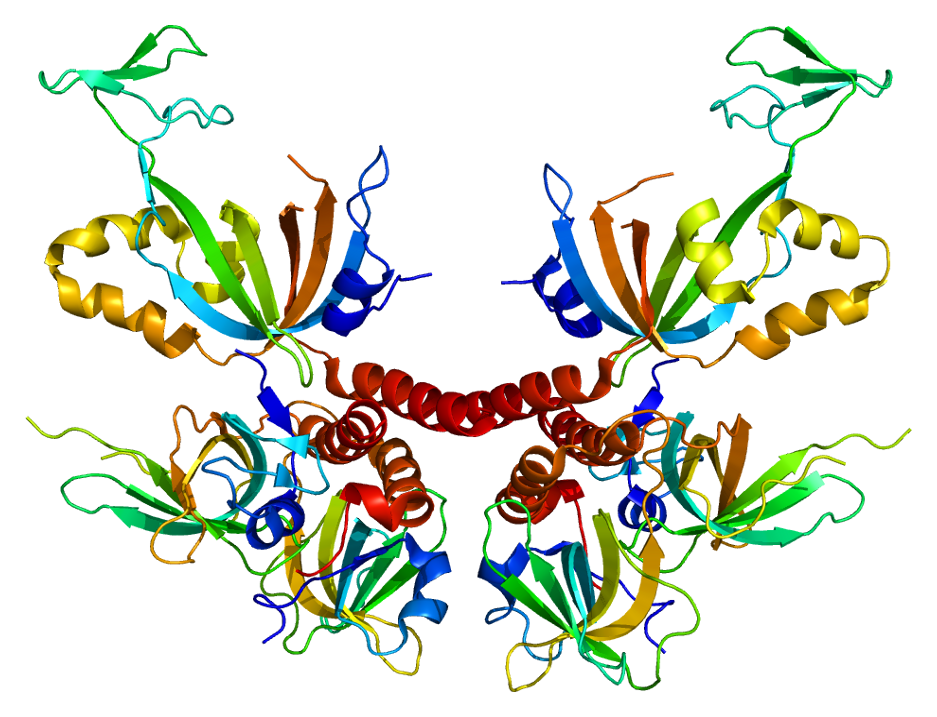

Identifiers
- Aliases: RPA3, REPA3, RP-A p14, replication protein A3
- External IDs: OMIM: 179837; MGI: 1915490; GeneCards: RPA3
Available structures
PDB	Ortholog search: PDBe RCSB
PDB	List of PDB id codes 1L1O, 1QUQ, 2PI2, 2PQA, 2Z6K, 3KDF

Gene location (Human)
Chr.	Chromosome 7 (human)
Band	7p21.3	Start	7,636,518 bp
Band	7p21.3	End	7,718,607 bp

Gene location (Mouse)
Chr.	Chromosome 6 (mouse)
Band	6|6 A1	Start	8,255,936 bp
Band	6|6 A1	End	8,259,173 bp
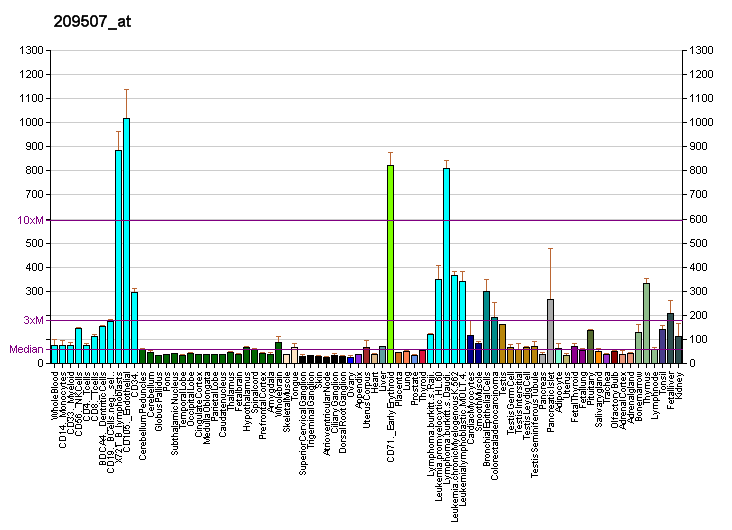
RNA expression pattern
Bgee	Human / Mouse (ortholog); Top expressed in: bronchial epithelial cell; beta cell; trabecular bone; embryo; ventricular zone; bone marrow; olfactory zone of nasal mucosa; nasal epithelium; ganglionic eminence; mucosa of transverse colon / Top expressed in: medial ganglionic eminence; otic placode; zygote; yolk sac; thymus; dermis; mandibular prominence; maxillary prominence; embryo; ventricular zone; More reference expression data
BioGPS	More reference expression data
Gene ontology
Molecular function	single-stranded DNA binding; DNA binding; damaged DNA binding; protein binding
Cellular component	nucleus; nucleoplasm; DNA replication factor A complex; site of double-strand break
Biological process	DNA recombination; translesion synthesis; DNA replication; nucleotide-excision repair, DNA gap filling; transcription-coupled nucleotide-excision repair; regulation of cell population proliferation; nucleotide-excision repair, DNA incision; error-free translesion synthesis; cellular response to DNA damage stimulus; regulation of mitotic cell cycle; regulation of cellular response to heat; interstrand cross-link repair; error-prone translesion synthesis; nucleotide-excision repair, DNA incision, 5'-to lesion; nucleotide-excision repair, preincision complex stabilization; nucleotide-excision repair; DNA repair; base-excision repair; double-strand break repair via homologous recombination; nucleotide-excision repair, preincision complex assembly; telomere maintenance; telomere maintenance via semi-conservative replication; G1/S transition of mitotic cell cycle; DNA mismatch repair; nucleotide-excision repair, DNA incision, 3'-to lesion; regulation of signal transduction by p53 class mediator
Sources:Amigo / QuickGO
Orthologs
Databases	NCBI: entry; OMA: entry
Species	Human	Mouse
Entrez	6119	68240
Ensembl	ENSG00000106399	ENSMUSG00000012483
UniProt	P35244	Q9CQ71
RefSeq (mRNA)	NM_002947	NM_026632
RefSeq (protein)	NP_002938	NP_080908
Location (UCSC)	Chr 7: 7.64 – 7.72 Mb	Chr 6: 8.26 – 8.26 Mb
PubMed search
- Wikidata
View/Edit Human	View/Edit Mouse

Replication protein A 14 kDa subunit is a protein that in humans is encoded by the RPA3 gene. RPA is a single-stranded DNA-binding protein that is conserved in eukaryotes and plays essential roles in the metabolism of nucleic acids. Unlike helicase, RPA does not separate strands but binds and protects exposed single-stranded DNA to prevent secondary structure formation and degradation. RPA is usually considered to be the functional equivalent of bacterial single-stranded DNA-binding proteins (SSB), although it is much more complex structurally in eukaryotic cells.

== Interactions ==
RPA3 has been shown to interact with replication protein A1 and replication protein A2. Together, they form a heterotrimeric complex that contributes to the direct binding of single-stranded DNA during replication, homologous recombination, nucleoetide excision repair, and mismatch repair. RPA3 can directly contact ssDNA on the 3' side of a substrate, and this polarity is crucial for the positioning and stability of nucleases that are involved in excision repair

== See also ==
- Single-stranded binding protein
- Replication protein A
- Replication protein A1
- Replication protein A2
