= CCNU =

CCNU can refer to:

- Cyclin U, a human gene that now has an official symbol of CCNO
- Lomustine, a chemotherapeutic agent
- Central China Normal University, a public university in Wuhan, Hubei, China
