= POLD1 =

Protein-coding gene in the species Homo sapiens

Identifiers
- Aliases: POLD1, CDC2, CRCS10, MDPL, POLD, polymerase (DNA) delta 1, catalytic subunit, DNA polymerase delta 1, catalytic subunit
- External IDs: OMIM: 174761; MGI: 97741; GeneCards: POLD1
Enzyme activity
| EC # | BRENDA | ExPASy | KEGG | MetaCyc |
|---|---|---|---|---|
| 2.7.7.7 | ↗ | ↗ | ↗ | ↗ |

Gene location (Human)
| Chr. | Chromosome 19 (human) |
| Band | 19q13.33 | Start | 50,384,204 bp |
| Band | 19q13.33 | End | 50,418,018 bp |

Gene location (Mouse)
| Chr. | Chromosome 7 (mouse) |
| Band | 7 B3|7 28.83 cM | Start | 44,182,170 bp |
| Band | 7 B3|7 28.83 cM | End | 44,198,273 bp |
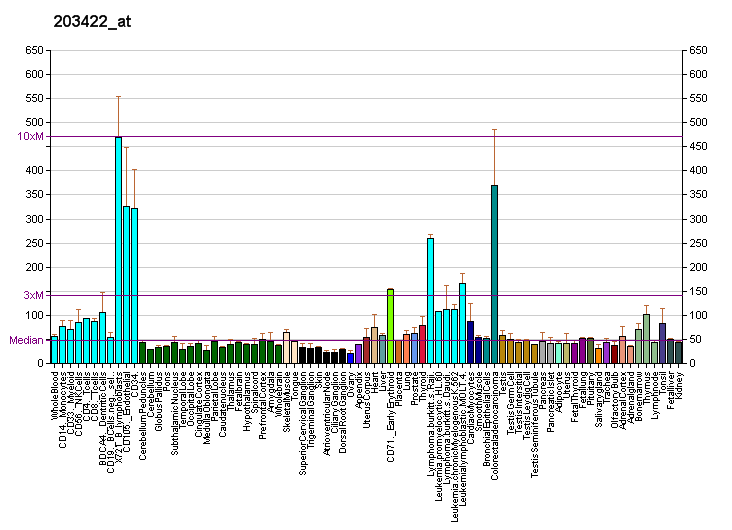
RNA expression pattern
| Bgee | Human / Mouse (ortholog); Top expressed in: mucosa of transverse colon; ventricular zone; gonad; granulocyte; spleen; ganglionic eminence; right lobe of thyroid gland; left testis; right testis; left lobe of thyroid gland / Top expressed in: internal carotid artery; renal corpuscle; external carotid artery; condyle; medullary collecting duct; fossa; Rostral migratory stream; Paneth cell; epiblast; primitive streak; More reference expression data |
| BioGPS | More reference expression data |
Gene ontology
| Molecular function | transferase activity; nucleotide binding; DNA binding; 4 iron, 4 sulfur cluster binding; nucleotidyltransferase activity; iron-sulfur cluster binding; chromatin binding; metal ion binding; damaged DNA binding; protein binding; 3'-5' exonuclease activity; 3'-5'-exodeoxyribonuclease activity; nucleic acid binding; DNA-directed DNA polymerase activity; nuclease activity; exonuclease activity; hydrolase activity |
| Cellular component | membrane; nucleoplasm; aggresome; nucleotide-excision repair complex; nucleus; delta DNA polymerase complex; cytosol |
| Biological process | nucleotide-excision repair, DNA gap filling; DNA synthesis involved in DNA repair; cellular response to UV; DNA replication; fatty acid homeostasis; DNA mismatch repair; translesion synthesis; transcription-coupled nucleotide-excision repair; nucleotide-excision repair, DNA incision; telomere maintenance; response to UV; nucleotide-excision repair, DNA incision, 5'-to lesion; DNA ligation; DNA repair; cellular response to DNA damage stimulus; base-excision repair, gap-filling; DNA replication proofreading; telomere maintenance via semi-conservative replication; DNA-dependent DNA replication |
Sources:Amigo / QuickGO
Orthologs
| Databases | NCBI: entry; OMA: entry |
| Species | Human | Mouse |
| Entrez | 5424 | 18971 |
| Ensembl | ENSG00000062822 | ENSMUSG00000038644 |
| UniProt | P28340 | P52431 |
| RefSeq (mRNA) | NM_001256849; NM_001308632; NM_002691 | NM_011131 |
| RefSeq (protein) | NP_001243778; NP_001295561; NP_002682 | NP_035261 |
| Location (UCSC) | Chr 19: 50.38 – 50.42 Mb | Chr 7: 44.18 – 44.2 Mb |
| PubMed search |
- Wikidata
| View/Edit Human | View/Edit Mouse |

DNA polymerase delta catalytic subunit (DPOD1) is an enzyme that is encoded in the human by the POLD1 gene, in the DNA polymerase delta complex. DPOD1 is responsible for synthesizing the lagging strand of DNA, and has also been implicated in some activities at the leading strand (Figure 1). The DPOD1 subunit encodes both DNA polymerizing and exonuclease domains, which provide the protein an important second function in proofreading to ensure replication accuracy during DNA synthesis, and in a number of types of replication-linked DNA repair following DNA damage.

Germline mutations impairing activity of POLD1 have been implicated in several types of hereditary cancer, in some sporadic cancers, and in a developmental syndrome of premature aging, Mandibular hypoplasia, Deafness, and Progeroid features and Lipodystrophy (MDPL/MDP syndrome). Studies of POLD1 emphasize the importance of maintaining genomic stability to limit tumorigenesis. It is currently unclear whether the enhanced tumorigenesis associated with POLD1 defects is the result of increased base substitutions or due to fork collapse and production of DNA double strand breaks (DSBs). Recent reviews have addressed important functions of POLD1.

== Discovery ==
The first DNA polymerase, DNA polymerase I, was discovered by Arthur Kornberg and his colleagues in 1956, reviewed in. In 1976, Byrnes et al. discovered a third DNA polymerase activity in mammalian cells that was called polymerase delta (δ). It was purified from rabbit erythroid hyperplastic bone marrow and described as a DNA polymerase that possessed an intrinsic 3' to 5' exonuclease activity. A 3'-5' exonuclease proofreading function for DNA polymerases (E. coli) had first been described 4 years earlier by Kornberg and Brutlag, reviewed in. The human DNA Polδ is a heterotetramer. The four subunits are: (POLD1/ p125), (POLD3/ p66), (POLD2/ p50) and (POLD4/ p12), with the alternative names reflecting the molecular weights expressed in kilodaltons (kDa). The polymerase catalytic subunit was identified as the 125 kDa polypeptide by activity staining in 1991. Several groups independently cloned the human and murine POLD1 cDNAs. Following its purification from various sources including calf thymus, human placenta, and HeLa cells, its activity was implicated in DNA repair.

== Gene ==
Polymerase (DNA) delta 1, catalytic subunit and POLD1 are the name and gene symbol approved by the Human Genome Organization (HUGO) Gene Nomenclature Committee (HGNC). POLD1 is also known as CDC2, MDPL, POLD, and CRCS10), is ~34 kb long and its cytogenetic location is chromosome 19 q13.33. The precise location, in the GRCh38.p2 assembly, is from base pair 50,384,290 to base pair 50,418,018 on chromosome 19. The mouse orthologue maps to mouse chromosome 7. In humans, the major POLD1 transcript (NM_002691.3) contains 27 exons and translates into the 1107 amino acids of the p125 or A subunit. A longer isoform has been reported with a 26 amino acid in-frame insertion after amino acid 592 (NP_001295561.1). A pseudogene (LOC100422453) has been reported on the long arm of chromosome 6. Table 1 provides gene names and chromosomal locations for the various subunits of Polδ in humans, mice, budding yeast (S. cerevisiae) and fission yeast (S. pombe).

The POLD1 gene promoter is regulated via the cell cycle machinery and mRNA expression of POLD1 reaches a peak in late G1/S phase during DNA replication. The POLD1 promoter is G/C-rich and has no TATA box. The transcription of this GC box-containing promoter is regulated by Sp1 and Sp1-related transcription factors such as Sp3, with their binding mediated via 11-bp repeat binding sequences. The POLD1 promoter contains an E2F-like sequence located near the major transcription start site. Another regulatory element, the cell cycle element/cell cycle genes homology region (CDE/CHR), located downstream of the start site is important for POLD1 transcription in G2/M phase by E2F1 and p21 proteins. P53 regulates POLD1 transcription by indirect p21-dependent activation of a p53-p21-DREAM-CDE/CHR pathway. One study has reported that the p53 tumor suppressor protein competes with Sp1 for binding to the POLD1 promoter. A microRNA (miR), miR-155, downregulates POLD1 indirectly by suppressing the transcription factor FOXO3a, which has putative binding sites in the POLD1 promoter (RTMAAYA; response element).

== Protein ==
Figure 1: A basic schematic of Polδ function at the DNA replication fork. The Polδ complex (p125, p66, p50 and p12) associates with replication fork. Single-stranded DNA are coated with replication protein A (RPA) (light pink). Polα bound to a primase, initiates lagging strand synthesis (blue line), herein an RNA primer is first elongated by Polα and then by Polδ. Leading strand (black line) shows Polε and GINS (go-ichi-ni-san) which has four subunits: Sld5, Psf1, Psf2 and Psf3. GINS interact with Polε to initiate DNA synthesis. Recent evidence also suggests a role for Polδ in leading strand synthesis. PCNA stimulates both polymerases (proliferating cell nuclear antigen; red ring). The RFC (replication factor C) complex with RPA acts as a clamp loader for PCNA onto the DNA. The lagging strand is synthesized in short fragments called the Okazaki fragments, which are then ligated by ligases (ligase I). Replication errors that are not corrected by the polymerases (light grey box on the new leading strand) are further repaired by post-replication mismatch repair (MMR).

POLD1/p125 has a common B-family fold, similar to other DNA polymerases (Polα and ε). Human POLD1/p125 has a putative nuclear localization signal at the N-terminal end (residues 4-19). Residues 304-533 contain the exonuclease domain (Figure 2) while residues 579-974 contain the polymerase domain. The exonuclease domain is a DEDDy-type DnaQ-like domain common to the B-DNA polymerase family. This domain has a beta hairpin structure that helps in switching between the polymerase and exonuclease active sites in case of nucleotide misincorporation.

Motifs A and C, which are the most conserved of the polymerase domain. These have 2 catalytic aspartates, in motif A (DXXLYPS, D602) and motif C (DTDS, D757) that bind calcium at the active site. Motif A has 11 amino acids that are important in nucleotide incorporation and formation of the phosphodiester bond.

Tyrosine Y701 functions similarly to tyrosine Y567 in the RB69 bacteriophage orthologue as the sugar steric gate that prevents ribonucleotide incorporation. An LXCXE motif (711 to 715) mediates binding to pRB during the G1 phase of cell cycle. The polymerase domain also has a highly conserved KKRY motif (residues 806 to 809) which is important for the binding and catalytic function. POLD1 can be targeted to the nucleolus upon acidification via a nucleolar detention sequence (NoDS) motif represented by small sequence motifs dispersed throughout the protein coding region. The C-terminal domain has two conserved cysteine-rich metal-binding motifs (CysA and CysB) (from 1012 and 1083) required for proliferating cell nuclear antigen (PCNA) binding and recruitment of accessory subunits respectively. CysB coordinates an [4Fe-4S] cluster added through Cytosolic Iron-sulfur protein Assembly (CIA), which requires the function of the mitochondrial Iron Sulfur Cluster (ISC) assembly machinery. The maturation process is mediated by the core targeting complex CIA1-CIA2B/FAM96B-MMS19, which interacts with the apoprotein to ensure specific Fe-S cluster insertion.

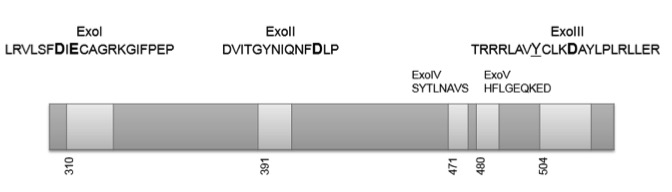
Figure 2: Conserved motifs in the exonuclease domain of human p125. Motifs I to III are conserved in the B-family of polymerases. Motifs IV and V were recently described as conserved between Polδ and Polε. This domain also has 3 sequence motifs (ExoI, ExoII and ExoIII) that have a specific YX(3)D pattern at ExoIII. The 4 conserved acid residues DEDD that serve as ligands for the metal ions required for catalysis are shown in bold (D316 and E318 in the ExoI motif, D402 in the ExoII motif and D515 in the ExoIII motif). Y511 (underlined) defines p125 of the DDEDy-type of exonuclease superfamilies according to the Zuo and Deutscher nomenclature, and is required for catalysis.

Binding and association studies have shown that POLD2 is tightly associated with POLD1; POLD3 and POLD2 interact with each other and POLD4 interacts with both POLD1 and POLD2. Polδ heterotetramer reconstituted by coexpression of subunits in Sf9 cells had properties were similar to Polδ purified from the calf thymus, and the complete holoenzyme was very strongly stimulated by PCNA. Numerous studies have shown that while POLD1 possesses both the polymerase and the 3'-5' exonuclease proofreading activity, the other subunits increase these activities, DNA binding abilities, and functionally important interactions with PCNA and its clamp loader Replication Factor C (RFC). The DNA Polδ holoenzyme is often considered to include PCNA and RFC as well as the four subunits of the polymerase complex (Figure 1).

A number of other studies and screens have identified additional interaction partners relevant to functions in DNA replication and repair. Figure 3 shows a matrix of established and putative interactions during replication and repair which can be further accessed through and. A website at Vanderbilt University provides additional interaction on important POLD1 protein structure and various classes of gene and protein interaction, based on criteria such as co-occurrence in a complex, direct physical interaction, regulatory relationship, and co-expression.

| Polymerase delta subunits | Protein name in human | Homo sapiens | Mus musculus | Saccharomyces cerevisiae | Schizosaccharomyces pombe |
|---|---|---|---|---|---|
| A (catalytic) | p125 | POLD1-Chr 19q13.3 | Pold1-Chr 7B4 | POL3-Chr IV | cdc6-Chr II |
| B (accessory) | p50 | POLD2-Chr 7p13 | Pold2-Chr 11A2 | POL31-Chr X | cdc1-Chr I |
| C (accessory) | p66 | POLD3-Chr 11q14 | Pold3-Chr 7F1 | POL32-Chr X | cdc27-Chr II |
| D (accessory) | p12 | POLD4-Chr 11q13 | Pold4-Chr 19A | - | cdm1-Chr II |
**Table 1: Gene names and chromosomal locations for the various subunits of polymerase delta in human, mouse, budding and fission yeast.**

=== Expression and regulation ===
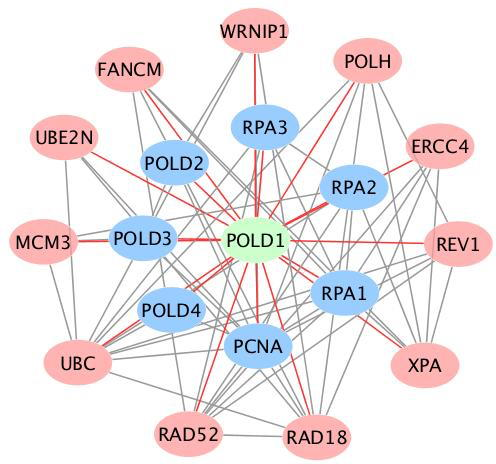
Figure 3. A matrix of established and putative partners for POLD1 extracted from STRING. (extracted on 03/31/2016). POLD1 is centered (light green box) with red lines indicating its interactions. The light blue boxes represent interactions of the core complex. The light pink boxes represent other putative interactions in DNA repair and replication. Grey lines represent established and putative interactions between the other represented proteins. The network was mapped by using Cytoscape. The interactions represent high- confidence experimental data extracted from BIND, DIP, GRID, HPRD, IntAct, MINT, and PID curated by STRING. The experimental scores are derived from assays on affinity binding and chromatography.

The POLD1/P125 protein is expressed ubiquitously across a panel of human tissues with high levels in the heart and lung tissues. The subcellular localization of POLD1/p125 is predominantly in the nucleus and nucleoplasm.

A reduction in POLD1/p125 has been observed in senescent human skin fibroblasts and in lymphocytes from an elderly population. POLD1/p125 expression is epigenetically regulated in response to DNA damage. Other studies have also shown that POLD1/p125 expression is regulated by miR-155, p53 and by the long non-coding RNA, PVT1. In the presence of DNA damage or replication stress (UV light, methyl methanesulfonate, hydroxyurea or aphidicolin), the POLD4/p12 subunit is rapidly degraded. The catalytic activities of p125 are different whether it is in the heterotetramer (Polδ4, with p12) or in the heterotrimer (Polδ3, without p12). The production of the heterotrimer depends on p12 degradation by the E3 ligase RNF8, a protein involved in DSBs repair and possibly homologous recombination (HR). In addition, the E3 ligase CRL4^{Cdt2} can degrade POLD4/p12 during normal DNA replication and in the presence of DNA damage. POLD4/p12 can also be degraded by the protease μ-calpain, that is involved in calcium-triggered apoptosis.

POLD1/p125 has a NoDS domain that regulates transport to the nucleolus in response to acidosis. Nucleolar transport requires a direct interaction between the p50 subunit and the WRN protein. During DNA damage response, WRN moves out of the nucleolus and thereby releases Polδ. POLD1/p125 has also been shown to interact with PDIP46/SKAR and LMO2.

== Function ==
=== DNA replication ===
DNA replication is a highly organized process that involves many enzymes and proteins, including several DNA polymerases. The major replicative activity in S phase of cell cycle depends on three DNA polymerases - Polymerase alpha (Polα), Polymerase delta (Polδ), and Polymerase epsilon (Polε). After initiation of DNA synthesis by Polα, Polδ or Polε execute lagging and leading strand synthesis, respectively. These polymerases maintain a very high fidelity, which is ensured by Watson-Crick base pairing and 3'-exonuclease (or the proofreading) activity. Recent studies have contended that Polδ may synthesize the leading strand. How these polymerases function, in relationship with other factors involved in replication, is of great interest as it likely explains the mutational landscape that they produce when defective. Maintenance of replication fidelity is a fine balance between the unique errors by polymerases δ and ε, the equilibrium between proofreading and MMR, and distinction in ribonucleotide processing between the two strands. Extensive studies in yeast models have shown that mutations in the exonuclease domain of Polδ and Polε homologues can cause a mutator phenotype, reviewed in. The single stranded (ss) DNA synthesized during lagging strand synthesis can be targeted by ss-DNA damaging agents as well as is a selective target for APOBEC mutations. DNA-binding proteins that rapidly reassociate post-replication prevent Polδ from repairing errors produced by Polα in the mature lagging strand. Yeast studies have shown that Polδ can proofread Polε errors on the leading strand.

=== DNA Repair ===
POLD1 activity contributes to multiple evolutionarily conserved DNA repair processes, including Mismatch repair (MMR), Translesion synthesis (TLS), Base excision repair (BER), Nucleotide Excision repair (NER) and double-strand break (DSB) repair. POLD1 mediates the post-incision steps in BER, NER and MMR. Polδ interacts with the MMR machinery to support post-replication proofreading of newly synthesized DNA, with cells bearing mutations that inactivate POLD1 and MMR components experiencing elevated mutation rates. As noted above, a Polδ heterotrimer (Polδ3) becomes the dominant oligomeric form of POLD1 and is active during the presence of DNA damage. Polδ3 is less error-prone than (Polδ4), and can discriminate better between mismatched pairs, associated with better proofreading activity: however, it has reduced ability to bypass some base lesions. Instead, Polδ polymerase switching to the specialized polymerase zeta (Polζ) is important for TLS as the substitution of p125 for the Polζ catalytic subunit, p353, permits better bypass activity. In this process, the highly conserved C-terminal domain (CTD) of POLD1/p125 interacts with the CTD domain of Polζ, and the iron clusters within each CTD mediate interactions involving binding to POLD2 that permit polymerase switching during TLS. Some recent studies suggest that a switch from Polδ to Pol lambda (λ) also supports the TLS and repair of oxidative DNA damage like 7,8-Dihydro-8-oxoguanine lesions.

Depletion of POLD1 can halt cell cycle at G1 and G2/M phases in human cells. Cell cycle block in these phases typically indicates presence of DNA damage and activation of DNA damage checkpoints. POLD1 depleted cells are sensitive to inhibition of DNA damage checkpoint kinases ATR and CHK1. In S. pombe, HR mechanisms could restart stalled replication forks by utilizing Polδ strand synthesis activity, but such nonallelic HR-mediated restart is very error prone potentially leading to increased genomic instability. Polδ structurally and functionally interacts with the WRN protein, and WRN recruits Polδ to the nucleolus. The WRN gene is mutated in Werner syndrome (an autosomal recessive disorder) leading to accelerated aging and increased genetic instability. The interaction with WRN increases the processivity of Polδ in a PCNA-independent manner. Through these interactions WRN directly impacts DNA replication-repair and assists in Polδ-mediated synthesis.

Accurate bypass of DNA damage can occur by a recombination-related mechanism involving template switching that employs polymerase δ-dependent DNA synthesis.

== Clinical significance ==
=== Cancer ===
DNA repair proteins have been shown to be important in human diseases including cancer. For example, germline mutations in DNA repair proteins involved in MMR (MSH2, MLH1, MSH6, and PMS2) have been described in Lynch syndrome (LS), which is characterized by the presence of microsatellite instability (MSI). More recently, germline mutations have been reported in the exonuclease domains of POLD1 and POLE, the catalytic subunit of Polε. These mutations are associated with oligo-adenomatous polyposis, early-onset colorectal cancer (CRC), endometrial cancer (EDMC), breast cancer, and brain tumors.( reviewed in) Most of the reported POLD1 mutations linked to cancer are present in the exonuclease domain. In contrast to LS, the POLD1 mutated tumors are microsatellite stable. Some data suggests the idea that POLD1 tumors are associated with driver mutations in genes including APC and KRAS. The POLD1 missense mutation p. S478N, in the exonuclease domain, has been validated as damaging and pathogenic. Other POLD1 variants have been clinically identified which have been predicted to be damaging and are currently under further investigation (e.g., p. D316H, p. D316G, p. R409W, p. L474P and p. P327L).

In pediatric patients, double hit mutations in POLD1 or POLE and biallelic mismatch repair deficiency (bMMRD), leads to ultra-hypermutated tumor phenotypes. Such phenotypes as ultra-hypermutation in tumors may indicate better response to newer cancer therapeutics in development, although this needs direct evaluation for POLD1. Bouffet et al. report two siblings with bMMRD- glioblastoma multiforme who have somatic mutations in POLE (P436H in one, S461P in the other), and showed a durable response to a clinical trial with the anti-programmed death-1 inhibitor nivolumab. POLD1 mutations have been studied in cell lines and mouse models. For example, a homozygous Polδ mutation in mice that disrupts enzymatic function leads to highly elevated cancer incidence.

=== MDPL ===
Damaging mutations in POLD1 have also been observed in patients with a syndrome known as mandibular hypoplasia, deafness, and progeroid features with lipodystrophy (MDPL/MDP) syndrome (#615381 in the Online Mendelian Inheritance in Man (OMIM) database). This is a very rare syndrome, and few studies describing mutations have been reported. The mutations that have been observed are in the regions that affect the exonuclease domain and polymerase domains. Five unrelated de novo cases have been described with the same heterozygous variant, c.1812_1814delCTC p.Ser605del (rs398122386). S605 is in the highly conserved motif A of the polymerase active site. This variant does not inhibit the DNA binding activity but impacts catalysis. Another variant has been reported in a separate patient (p.R507C). This variant is located in the highly conserved ExoIII domain and has not been completely characterized as yet.

POLD1 Ser605del and R507C variants have also been identified in a subset of patients with atypical Werner's syndrome (AWS). After molecular testing, these patients were reclassified as MDPL/MDP patients. MDPL/MDP, AWS and Werner's syndrome all present with progeria. A first example of germline transmission was observed in a mother and son with the Ser605del mutation. Recently, two independent studies identified patients with the same homozygous splice variant in POLE1, the catalytic subunit of Polε. One presented with a phenotype of facial dysmorphism, immunodeficiency, livedo, and short stature (also knowns as the FILS syndrome). The second one presented with more severe symptoms. These cases join a growing number of developmental defects associated with inherited mutations targeting the function of polymerase genes.

Age-dependent downregulation of POLD1 has been observed. although no clinical significance has been associated with this phenotype as yet. Studies are also underway to understand if there is a relation between these pathologies or these mutations and a predisposition to cancer. Currently proposed mechanisms by which POLD1 defects are pathogenic focus on the idea of replication defects leading to genomic instability and checkpoint activation, ultimately leading to cell death or cellular senescence. Alternatively, Polδ is associated with lamins and the nuclear envelope during G1/S arrest or early S phase; mutations in lamins cause nuclear envelope-related lipodystrophies with phenotypes similar to MDPL/MDP and Werner's syndrome.

=== Cancer risk assessment and commercial testing ===
The hereditary colorectal cancers (CRCs) associated with mutations in the proofreading ability of POLD1 and POLE are sometimes termed as "polymerase proofreading associated polyposis" (PPAP), (although at least one study has identified POLD1 mutations associated with non-polyposis CRC). POLD1 mutations have also been associated with an increased cancer predisposition of endometrial cancer. A recent study has suggested guidelines for genetic testing for POLD1 mutations which include: 1) Occurrence of 20-100 adenomas, and 2) Family history that meets the Amsterdam II criteria for colorectal and endometrial cancers. Current clinical testing guidelines for families with mutations in POLD1/POLE include colonoscopies (every 1–2 years), gastroduodenoscopies (every 3 years) starting early (20-25), possibility for brain tumors and endometrial cancer screening (beginning at 40 for female carriers). Currently studies are underway to determine the exact cancer risk from specific POLD1 mutations. Current data suggest that mutations in this gene are highly penetrant. Another recent study showed that mutations affecting Polδ and Polε mutations can co-occur along with MMR mutations. This suggests panel gene testing should include MMR and Pol genes even in patients with MSI.

There are several options for commercial diagnostic testing for mutations in POLD1. Genetic testing typically includes POLD1 coding exons (26) and at least 20 bases into the adjacent non-coding regions. For families with known mutations, single site testing is also available to confirm the presence of a mutation. The availability of these genetic tests has opened up new possibilities for cancers previously classified as genetically undefined colorectal cancers or colorectal cancer type "X". Resources for clinical testing for MDPL/MDP have also been developed.
