= OB-fold =

Protein superfamily

Oligonucleotide/oligosaccharide binding fold
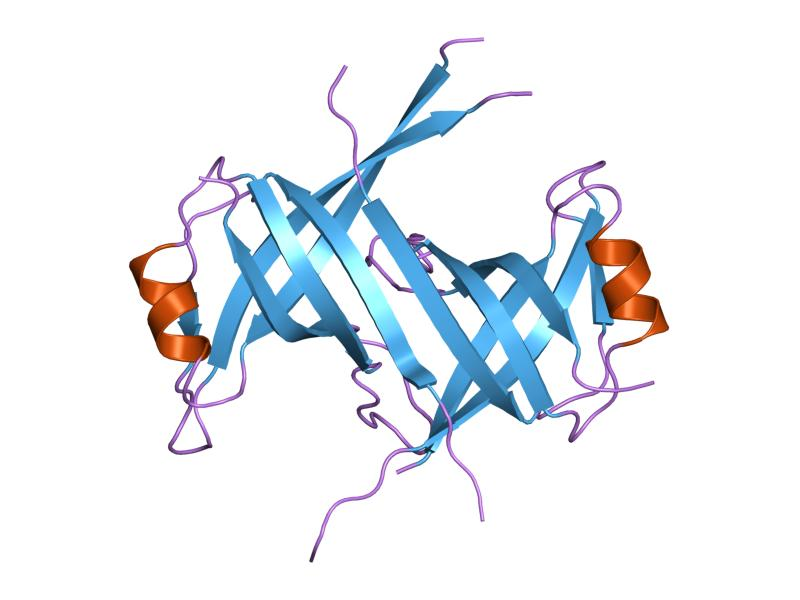
- Cartoon representation of the crystal structure of human mitochondrial single-stranded DNA binding protein (PDB: 3ull)

Identifiers
- Symbol: OB-fold
- Pfam clan: CL0021
- ECOD: 2
- InterPro: IPR012340
Available protein structures:
- PDB: IPR012340
- AlphaFold: IPR012340

In molecular biology, the OB-fold (oligonucleotide/oligosaccharide-binding fold) is a small protein structural motif observed in different proteins that bind oligonucleotides or oligosaccharides. It was originally identified in 1993 in four unrelated proteins: staphylococcal nuclease, anticodon binding domain of aspartyl-tRNA synthetase, and the B-subunits of heat-labile enterotoxin and verotoxin-1. Since then it has been found in multiple proteins many of which are involved in genome stability. This fold is often described as a Greek key motif.

== Structure ==
The OB-fold consists of a five-stranded β-sheet coiled to form a closed β-barrel, capped by an α-helix located at one end and a binding cleft at the other. The α-helix packs against the bottom layer of residues, roughly perpendicular to the barrel axis. The β-sheet structure protrudes beyond this layer and packs around the sides of the helix. The binding specificities of each OB-fold depend on the different length, sequence, and conformation of the loops connecting the β-strands.

=== Structural determinants ===
OB-fold domains have several key structural determinants. These common features arise from physical principles governing protein structure rather than from sequence homology.

- β-sheet structure:

The closed β-sheet has specific parameters that determine geometrical features like mean radius and average angle between strand directions and barrel axis.

- β-bulges:

Most structures have a common β-bulge in the first strand. β-bulges provide small increases in barrel radius and required coiling of β-strands.

- Interior residue packing:

The interior of the closed β-sheet has a regular three-layer structure of residues, with each β-strand contributing one residue to each layer.

- β-barrel deformation:

Many β-barrels are similarly flattened, with an elliptical cross-section.

- Barrel-helix interface:

A cavity on the barrel axis is filled by a large hydrophobic residue from the helix.

- Binding site location:

In some proteins, the binding sites are located on the side surface of the β-barrel where three loops come together, in such a way they are partially wrapped by the binding partner. In others, the binding cleft at the side of the barrel opposite to the helix functions as binding site.

== Function ==
OB-folds are versatile binding domains that can interact with single-stranded DNA (ssDNA), double-stranded DNA (dsDNA), RNA, proteins, phospholipids and oligosaccharides. In genome guardian proteins, OB-folds play crucial roles in DNA binding and recognition, protein-protein interactions and catalytic functions in multi-subunit complexes.

== Examples of proteins containing this domain ==
- Single-stranded DNA binding protein (SSB)
- Replication Protein A (RPA)
- RecG helicase
- RuvA (part of the Holliday junction branch migration complex)
- Minichromosome maintenance (MCM) proteins
- DNA ligase III
- RecO (recombination mediator)

== Relationship to SH3 domains ==
OB-folds are structurally similar to Src homology 3 (SH3) domains, with their β-strands superimposing with less than 2 Å difference. This structural similarity is important for understanding OB-fold function and regulation, as SH3 domains bind to PXXP-containing ligands in a pocket similar to the ssDNA binding pocket of many OB-folds.

== Evolution and distribution ==
The OB-fold may represent a stable folding motif that appeared early in protein evolution, with its wide occurrence due to its adaptability to different functions and sequences. OB-fold proteins present great versatility, which likely contributed to the development and widespread adoption of the fold in genome guardian proteins. They can adopt various oligomerisation states and quaternary structures, allowing for complex and dynamic interactions. The OB-fold has flexibility in binding to a variety of substrates through variations in loop sizes, compositions, and insertions, showing a modular nature. In some cases, it can provide catalytic functions to multi-subunit complexes, expanding its utility beyond just binding. Its structural similarity to SH3 domains allows OB-folds to participate in protein-protein interactions, enabling regulation and complex formation.
