= TIPIN =

Protein-coding gene in the species Homo sapiens

Identifiers
- Aliases: TIPIN, TIMELESS interacting protein
- External IDs: OMIM: 610716; MGI: 1921571; HomoloGene: 32373; GeneCards: TIPIN; OMA:TIPIN - orthologs

Gene location (Human)
Chr.	Chromosome 15 (human)
Band	15q22.31	Start	66,336,191 bp
Band	15q22.31	End	66,386,746 bp

Gene location (Mouse)
Chr.	Chromosome 9 (mouse)
Band	9 C|9 34.6 cM	Start	64,188,863 bp
Band	9 C|9 34.6 cM	End	64,212,706 bp
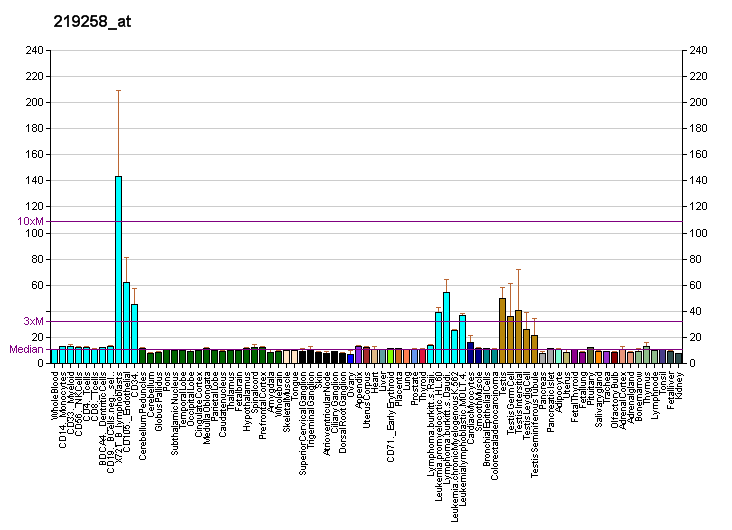
RNA expression pattern
Bgee	Human / Mouse (ortholog); Top expressed in: gonad; testicle; Achilles tendon; secondary oocyte; right testis; left testis; ganglionic eminence; ventricular zone; islet of Langerhans; sperm / Top expressed in: fetal liver hematopoietic progenitor cell; medial ganglionic eminence; mandibular prominence; otic placode; abdominal wall; embryo; maxillary prominence; somite; primitive streak; ventricular zone; More reference expression data
BioGPS	More reference expression data
Gene ontology
Molecular function	protein binding; DNA binding
Cellular component	intracellular membrane-bounded organelle; nucleus; nucleoplasm; cytoplasm; replication fork protection complex
Biological process	cell cycle phase transition; mitotic intra-S DNA damage checkpoint signaling; cellular response to DNA damage stimulus; cell division; DNA replication checkpoint signaling; regulation of nuclear cell cycle DNA replication; positive regulation of cell population proliferation; cell cycle; replication fork arrest; replication fork protection; DNA damage checkpoint signaling; response to UV; DNA replication
Sources:Amigo / QuickGO
Orthologs
Species	Human	Mouse
Entrez	54962	66131
Ensembl	ENSG00000075131	ENSMUSG00000032397
UniProt	Q9BVW5	Q91WA1
RefSeq (mRNA)	NM_001289986; NM_017858; NM_001398281; NM_001398282; NM_001398283 NM_001398284; NM_001398285; NM_001398286; NM_001398287	NM_025372; NM_001324556; NM_001324557; NM_001324558
RefSeq (protein)	NP_001276915; NP_060328	NP_001311485; NP_001311486; NP_001311487; NP_079648
Location (UCSC)	Chr 15: 66.34 – 66.39 Mb	Chr 9: 64.19 – 64.21 Mb
PubMed search
- Wikidata
View/Edit Human	View/Edit Mouse

TIMELESS-interacting protein (TIPIN) is a protein that in humans is encoded by the TIPIN gene.

== Structure ==
TIPIN is a relatively small protein that lacks known enzymatic activity and functions primarily through protein-protein interactions. It forms a stable complex with TIMELESS, a binding interaction that is essential for its role in the replication stress response. Crystallographic and structural studies have confirmed direct interactions between TIPIN, TIMELESS, and other components of the replication machinery.

TIPIN contains a central core region, predominantly alpha-helical and spanning amino acids 57–160, which is both necessary and sufficient for stable binding to TIMELESS. Structural analyses, including studies of the yeast orthologue Csm3, show that this region adopts a five-helix bundle that interfaces with the C-terminal region of TIMELESS (Tof1 in yeast). This interaction is mediated through a hydrophobic surface stabilized by salt bridges. The N- and C-terminal tails of TIPIN are not required for complex formation, highlighting the central helical core as the primary structured domain involved. This structural configuration supports a scaffolding or mechanical role for TIPIN in replication fork stability and checkpoint activation. No additional structured domains have been identified beyond the central core, which is sufficient for its function within the replication fork protection complex.

== Function ==
TIPIN forms a heterodimeric complex with the TIMELESS (TIM) protein and plays a central role in DNA replication and the stabilization of replication forks under normal and stress conditions. This complex helps regulate the pace of replication fork movement and participates in the activation of the Intra-S-phase checkpoint in response to DNA damage.

The TIPIN-TIM complex is essential for proper replication fork protection and coordination of DNA damage responses. TIPIN deficiency leads to stalled replication forks and increased chromosomal instability, highlighting its role in preserving genome integrity. Additionally, TIPIN helps mediate the ATR-CHK1 checkpoint pathway, which delays cell cycle progression in response to replication stress.

== Interactions ==
TIPIN has been shown to interact with:

- TIMELESS protein – forming a complex that is essential for DNA replication and checkpoint function.
- Replication protein A1 (RPA1) – facilitating recruitment to stalled forks and checkpoint activation.
- Claspin – involved in replication checkpoint signaling.

== Clinical significance ==
Although no specific mutations in the TIPIN gene have been directly associated with human diseases, dysfunction of the TIPIN-TIM complex can compromise genome stability and is thus relevant in the context of cancer biology. TIPIN expression may also be altered in tumors with replication stress or deficient checkpoint control.
