= Attenuated familial adenomatous polyposis =

- Other names: Attenuated familial polyposis coli
- Specialty: Oncology

Attenuated familial adenomatous polyposis is a form of familial adenomatous polyposis, a cancer syndrome. It is a pre-malignant disease that can develop into colorectal cancer. A patient will have fewer than a hundred polyps located typically in right side of the colon. Cancer might develop as early as the age of five, though typically presents later than classical FAP.

== See also ==
- Familial adenomatous polyposis
- Birt–Hogg–Dubé syndrome
- Cowden syndrome
- Cronkhite–Canada syndrome
- Juvenile polyposis
- MUTYH
- Peutz–Jeghers syndrome
