= Replication protein A1 =

Protein-coding gene in the species Homo sapiens

RPA1
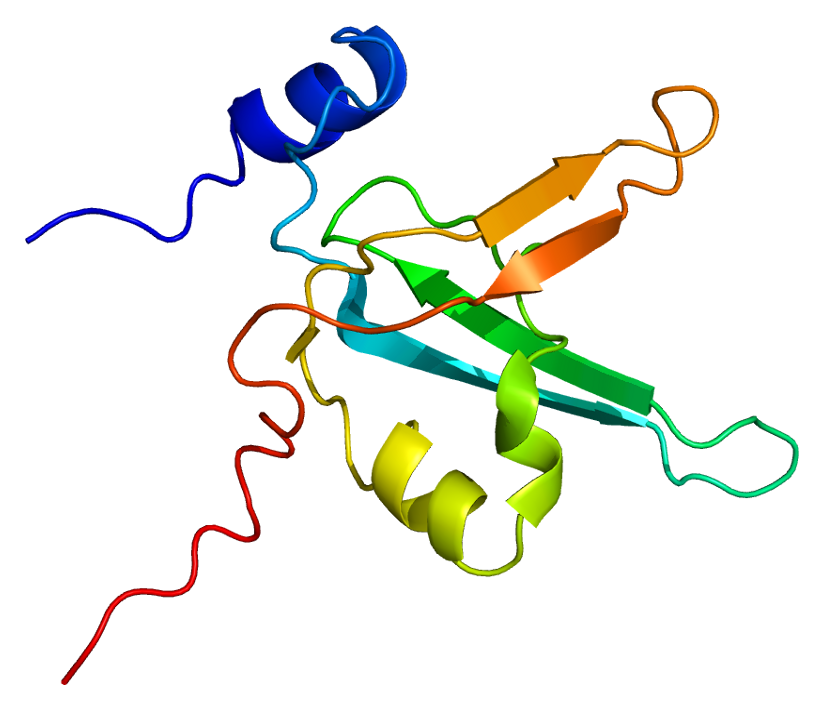

Identifiers
- Aliases: RPA1, HSSB, MST075, REPA1, RF-A, RP-A, RPA70, Replication protein A1, PFBMFT6
- External IDs: OMIM: 179835; MGI: 1915525; GeneCards: RPA1
Available structures
PDB	Ortholog search: PDBe RCSB
PDB	List of PDB id codes 1EWI, 1FGU, 1JMC, 1L1O, 2B29, 2B3G, 4IJH, 4IJL, 4IPC, 4IPD, 4IPG, 4IPH, 4LUO, 4LUV, 4LUZ, 4LW1, 4LWC, 4NB3, 4O0A, 4R4C, 4R4I, 4R4O, 4R4Q, 4R4T, 5E7N, 5EAY

Gene location (Human)
Chr.	Chromosome 17 (human)
Band	17p13.3	Start	1,829,702 bp
Band	17p13.3	End	1,900,082 bp

Gene location (Mouse)
Chr.	Chromosome 11 (mouse)
Band	11 B5|11 45.79 cM	Start	75,188,992 bp
Band	11 B5|11 45.79 cM	End	75,239,150 bp
RNA expression pattern
Bgee	Human / Mouse (ortholog); Top expressed in: secondary oocyte; ventricular zone; ganglionic eminence; parietal pleura; visceral pleura; germinal epithelium; gingival epithelium; trabecular bone; tibia; parotid gland / Top expressed in: fetal liver hematopoietic progenitor cell; retinal pigment epithelium; ciliary body; primitive streak; vestibular membrane of cochlear duct; iris; Epithelium of choroid plexus; abdominal wall; endothelial cell of lymphatic vessel; Paneth cell; More reference expression data
BioGPS	n/a
Gene ontology
Molecular function	DNA binding; metal ion binding; single-stranded DNA binding; damaged DNA binding; protein binding; nucleic acid binding; G-rich strand telomeric DNA binding; single-stranded telomeric DNA binding; sequence-specific DNA binding
Cellular component	PML body; nucleoplasm; DNA replication factor A complex; nucleus; site of DNA damage
Biological process	DNA-dependent DNA replication; nucleotide-excision repair, DNA gap filling; DNA recombination; interstrand cross-link repair; error-free translesion synthesis; G1 phase; error-prone translesion synthesis; cellular response to DNA damage stimulus; DNA replication; regulation of cellular response to heat; DNA mismatch repair; translesion synthesis; transcription-coupled nucleotide-excision repair; nucleotide-excision repair, DNA incision; nucleotide-excision repair, DNA incision, 3'-to lesion; nucleotide-excision repair, DNA incision, 5'-to lesion; nucleotide-excision repair, preincision complex stabilization; nucleotide-excision repair; DNA repair; base-excision repair; regulation of signal transduction by p53 class mediator; double-strand break repair via homologous recombination; nucleotide-excision repair, preincision complex assembly; protein localization to chromosome; telomere maintenance; telomere maintenance via semi-conservative replication; G1/S transition of mitotic cell cycle; DNA unwinding involved in DNA replication; telomere maintenance via telomerase; meiosis
Sources:Amigo / QuickGO
Orthologs
Databases	NCBI: entry; OMA: entry
Species	Human	Mouse
Entrez	6117	68275
Ensembl	ENSG00000132383	ENSMUSG00000000751
UniProt	P27694	Q8VEE4
RefSeq (mRNA)	NM_002945; NM_001355120; NM_001355121	NM_001164223; NM_026653
RefSeq (protein)	NP_002936; NP_001342049; NP_001342050	NP_001157695; NP_080929
Location (UCSC)	Chr 17: 1.83 – 1.9 Mb	Chr 11: 75.19 – 75.24 Mb
PubMed search
- Wikidata
View/Edit Human	View/Edit Mouse

Replication protein A 70 kDa DNA-binding subunit is a protein that in humans is encoded by the RPA1 gene.

== Interactions ==
Replication protein A1 has been shown to interact with:

- BRCA2,
- BLM,
- MCM2,
- MCM4,
- MCM6,
- MCM7,
- MUTYH,
- ORC2L,
- ORC6L,
- P53,
- RPA2,
- RPA3,
- TIPIN,
- TP53BP1, and
- XPA.

== See also ==
- DNA-binding subunit
- Replication protein A
- Replication protein A2
- Replication protein A3
- Single-stranded binding protein
