= Replication protein A =

Protein that binds to single-stranded DNA in eukaryotic cells

- (heterotrimer)
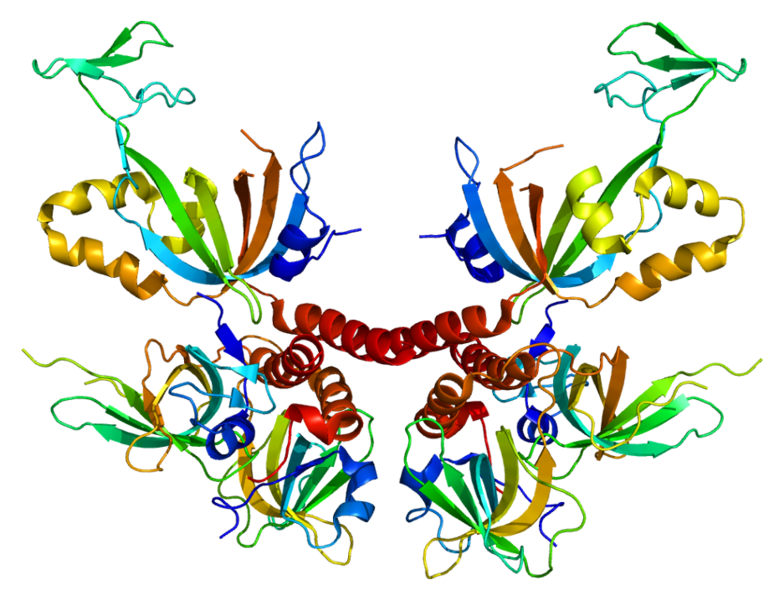
- This is an image of human Replication protein A. From PDB: 1L1O Proteopedia protein A Replication protein A
- Function: damaged DNA binding, single-stranded DNA binding
Subunit name	Gene	Chromosomal locus
Replication protein A1	RPA1	Chr. 17 p13.3
Replication protein A2	RPA2	Chr. 1 p35.3
Replication protein A3	RPA3	Chr. 7 p21.3

Steps in DNA synthesis, with RPA shown

Replication protein A (RPA) is the major protein that binds to single-stranded DNA (ssDNA) in eukaryotic cells. In vitro, RPA shows a much higher affinity for ssDNA than RNA or double-stranded DNA. RPA is required in replication, recombination and repair processes such as nucleotide excision repair and homologous recombination. It also plays roles in responding to damaged DNA.

== Structure ==
RPA is a heterotrimer, composed of the subunits RPA1 (RPA70) (70kDa subunit), RPA2 (RPA32) (32kDa subunit) and RPA3 (RPA14) (14kDa subunit). The three RPA subunits contain six OB-folds (oligonucleotide/oligosaccharide binding), with DNA-binding domains (DBD) designated DBDs A-F, that bind RPA to single-stranded DNA.

DBDs A, B, C and F are located on RPA1, DBD D is located on RPA2, and DBD E is located on RPA3. DBDs C, D, and E make up the trimerization core of the protein with flexible linker regions connecting them all together. Due to these flexible linker regions RPA is considered highly flexible and this supports the dynamic binding that RPA is able to achieve. Because of this dynamic binding, RPA is also capable of different conformations that leads to varied numbers of nucleotides that it can engage.

DBDs A, B, C and D are the sites that are involved in ssDNA binding. Protein-protein interactions between RPA and other proteins happen at the N-terminal of RPA1, specifically DBD F, along with the C-terminal of RPA2. Phosphorylation of RPA takes place at the N-terminus of RPA2.

RPA shares many features with the CST complex heterotrimer, although RPA has a more uniform 1:1:1 stoichiometry.

== Functions ==
During DNA replication, RPA prevents single-stranded DNA (ssDNA) from winding back on itself or from forming secondary structures. It also helps protect the ssDNA from being attacked by endonucleases. This keeps DNA unwound for the polymerase to replicate it. RPA also binds to ssDNA during the initial phase of homologous recombination, an important process in DNA repair and prophase I of meiosis.

RPA has a key role in the maintenance of the recombination checkpoint during meiosis of the yeast Saccharomyces cerevisiae. RPA appears to act as a sensor of single-strand DNA for the activation of the meiotic DNA damage response.

Hypersensitivity to DNA damaging agents can be caused by mutations in the RPA gene. Like its role in DNA replication, this keeps ssDNA from binding to itself (self-complementizing) so that the resulting nucleoprotein filament can then be bound by Rad51 and its cofactors.

RPA also binds to DNA during the nucleotide excision repair process. This binding stabilizes the repair complex during the repair process. A bacterial homolog is called single-strand binding protein (SSB).

== See also ==
- Single-stranded binding protein
- Replication protein A1
- Replication protein A2
- Replication protein A3
