= MUTYH =

Protein-coding gene in humans

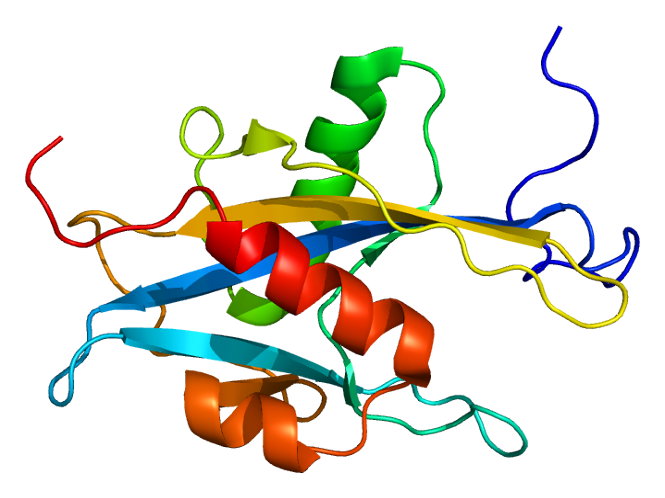

Identifiers
- Aliases: MUTYH, MYH, mutY DNA glycosylase, mutY homolog (E. coli)
- External IDs: OMIM: 604933; MGI: 1917853; GeneCards: MUTYH
Available structures
PDB	Ortholog search: PDBe RCSB
PDB	List of PDB id codes 1X51, 3N5N
Enzyme activity
EC #	BRENDA	ExPASy	KEGG	MetaCyc
3.2.2.31	↗	↗	↗	↗

Gene location (Human)
Chr.	Chromosome 1 (human)
Band	1p34.1	Start	45,329,163 bp
Band	1p34.1	End	45,340,893 bp

Gene location (Mouse)
Chr.	Chromosome 4 (mouse)
Band	4|4 D1	Start	116,664,920 bp
Band	4|4 D1	End	116,676,637 bp
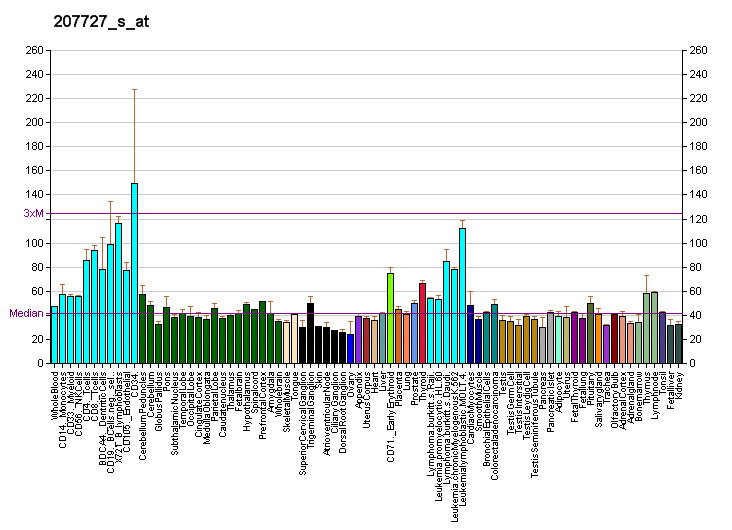
RNA expression pattern
Bgee	Human / Mouse (ortholog); Top expressed in: cerebellar hemisphere; right hemisphere of cerebellum; mucosa of transverse colon; granulocyte; right lobe of thyroid gland; right uterine tube; left lobe of thyroid gland; spleen; tibial nerve; pituitary gland / Top expressed in: tail of embryo; embryo; epiblast; embryo; morula; ventricular zone; blastocyst; secondary oocyte; genital tubercle; ectoderm; More reference expression data
BioGPS	More reference expression data
Gene ontology
Molecular function	MutSalpha complex binding; metal ion binding; hydrolase activity, acting on glycosyl bonds; hydrolase activity; catalytic activity; iron-sulfur cluster binding; MutLalpha complex binding; 4 iron, 4 sulfur cluster binding; MutLbeta complex binding; MutSbeta complex binding; protein binding; DNA N-glycosylase activity; DNA binding; purine-specific mismatch base pair DNA N-glycosylase activity; oxidized purine DNA binding; 8-oxo-7,8-dihydroguanine DNA N-glycosylase activity; adenine/guanine mispair binding
Cellular component	nucleoplasm; mitochondrion; nucleus
Biological process	DNA repair; metabolism; depurination; cellular response to DNA damage stimulus; DNA mismatch repair; base-excision repair
Sources:Amigo / QuickGO
Orthologs
Databases	NCBI: entry; OMA: entry
Species	Human	Mouse
Entrez	4595	70603
Ensembl	ENSG00000132781	ENSMUSG00000028687
UniProt	Q9UIF7	Q99P21
RefSeq (mRNA)	NM_001048171; NM_001048172; NM_001048173; NM_001048174; NM_001128425 NM_001293190; NM_001293191; NM_001293192; NM_001293195; NM_001293196; NM_012222; NM_001350650; NM_001350651	NM_001159581; NM_133250; NM_001316747
RefSeq (protein)	NP_001041636; NP_001041637; NP_001041638; NP_001041639; NP_001121897 NP_001280119; NP_001280120; NP_001280121; NP_001280124; NP_001280125; NP_036354; NP_001337579; NP_001337580; NP_001280121.1; NP_001280125.1	NP_001153053; NP_001303676; NP_573513
Location (UCSC)	Chr 1: 45.33 – 45.34 Mb	Chr 4: 116.66 – 116.68 Mb
PubMed search
- Wikidata
View/Edit Human	View/Edit Mouse

MUTYH (mutY DNA glycosylase) is a human gene that encodes a DNA glycosylase, MUTYH glycosylase. It is involved in oxidative DNA damage repair and is part of the base excision repair pathway. The enzyme excises adenine bases from the DNA backbone at sites where adenine is inappropriately paired with guanine, cytosine, or 8-oxo-7,8-dihydroguanine, a common form of oxidative DNA damage.

The protein is localized to the nucleus and mitochondria. Mutations in this gene result in heritable predisposition to colon and stomach cancer. Multiple transcript variants encoding different isoforms have been found for this gene.

== Gene ==
MUTYH has its locus on the short (p) arm of chromosome 1 (1p34.1), from base pair 45,464,007 to base pair 45,475,152 (45,794,835–45,806,142). The gene is composed of 16 exons and has a size of 546 amino acids and is approximately 7.1kb.

== Tissue distribution ==
MUTYH is overexpressed in CD4-T cells, the prostate, the colon, where cells frequently divide, and the rectum. There is evidence of MUTYH expression in kidney, intestinal, nervous system and muscle tissues.

== Structure ==
The presence of disulfide crosslinking gives rise to a complex crystal structure of the MUTY-DNA. The protein structure of the MUTYH gene has its N-terminal on the 5' and the C-terminal on the 3'. Within the N-terminal, there is a helix-hairpin-helix and pseudo helix-hairpin-helix in addition to an iron cluster motif.

== Function ==
Repair of oxidative DNA damage is the result of a collaborative effort of MUTYH, OGG1, and MTH1. MUTYH acts on the adenine base that is mispaired to 8-oxoG, while OGG1 detects and acts on 8-oxoG, removing it. TP53 transcriptionally regulates MUTYH and may potentially act as a regulator for p53.

MUTYH and OGG1 excision of bases causes the formation of apurinic/ apyrimidinic sites (AP sites). These sites are mutagenic in nature and require constant and immediate repair which is achieved by the active involvement of protein complexes that repair the AP site via short and long patch repair pathways.

The short patch repair pathway employs POLB (DNA polymerase beta), APE1, XRCC1, PARP1 with the addition of either the LIG1 or LIG3 genes. When an insertion of one nucleotide occurs, the enzyme AP endonuclease (APEX/APE1) cuts out the mismatched base pairs at the AP site and this causes the evolvement of 5'dRP (5' deoxyribose phosphate), a terminal blocking group, and 3'-OH ( 3' hydroxyl end). POLB is required to remove the 5'dRP, and it does this by enzymatic activity, namely polymerase and dRP lyase. DNA ligase is used to seal the fragments after dRP excision causes the formation of 5'PO4 that is necessary to form the phosphodiester bonds of DNA. The purpose of PARP1 and XRCC1 in the single strand break repair pathway, is to stabilize the strands of DNA while they undergo repair, synthesis, gap-filling and ligation. PARP1 acts as a recruit agent for XRCC1. The nick sealing of the strands is accomplished by the formation of LIG1 (DNA ligase 1) and/or LIG3/ XRCCI complex that attach to processed end of the corrected strands and reinstate the original conformation of the strand.

Long patch repair comes into play when more nucleotides are involved, ranging from 2 to 12. It is hypothesized that Polymerase 𝜹 (POLD) and Polymerase 𝛆 (POLE), assisted by the PCNA (proliferating cell nuclear antigen) in conjunction with replication factor C (RFC) that acts as a stabilizer and places newly synthesized nucleotides on the DNA strand. Both the polymerases repair the DNA by employing the strand displacement synthesis mechanism. This mechanism occurs downstream a DNA strand and the 5' is transformed into a "flap intermediate" causing it to be "displaced". FEN1 (flap structure-specific endonuclease 1), a nuclease, removes the displaced strand and this results in a ligatable strand of DNA.Long patch repair, like short patch repair, includes the use of APE1 and PARP1 and LIG1. The repair pathway is partially determined by the amount of ATP present after the removal of the deoxyribose phosphate end. The long patch repair pathway is preferred under conditions of low ATP concentration while the short repair pathway is preferred under high concentrations of ATP.

== Protein interactions ==
MUTYH has been shown to interact with Replication protein A1, PCNA and APEX1.

Other notable interactions include MUTYH and Replication protein A is a single strand binding protein that prevents the annealing of DNA during replication, it also plays a role as an activator for damage repair on DNA. There is a hypothetical relation between the interaction of Mismatch Repair proteins (MMR) such as MSH 2,3 and 6, MLH1, PMS1 and 2, and MUTYH in which the proposed result of their partnering is to increase susceptibility to cancer.

== Regulation of expression by xenobiotics ==
The gene interacts with the following chemicals:

a) Carbon tetrachloride: decreased expression of MUTYH mRNA

b) Ethanol: When treated together with dronabinol) increased expression of MUTYH mRNA. When used alone, it has conflicting results of decreased and increased the MUTYH mRNA.

c) Ethinylestradiol: When used alone it results in the increased expression of MUTYH mRNA.When treated together with tetrachlorodibenzo p dioxin, there is increased expression of MUTYH mRNA.

d) Tamoxifen: affects MUTYH

== Clinical significance ==
The table of the Gene-phenotype associations summarizes the diseases/conditions that arise from mutations in MUTYH

Phenotype/Condition	Mode of Inheritance
Familial adenomatous polyposis	Autosomal recessive
Pilomatricoma	Somatic mutation
Gastric cancer	Somatic mutation
Endometrial cancer	Biallelic germline mutation

Mutations in the MUTYH gene cause an autosomal recessive disorder similar to familial adenomatous polyposis (also called MUTYH-associated polyposis). Polyps caused by mutated MUTYH do not appear until adulthood and are less numerous than those found in patients with APC gene mutations. Both copies of the MUTYH gene are mutated in individuals who have autosomal recessive familial adenomatous polyposis i.e., the mutations for the MUTYH gene is biallelic. Mutations in this gene affect the ability of cells to correct mistakes made during DNA replication. Most reported mutations in this gene cause production of a nonfunctional or low functioning glycosylase enzyme. When base excision repair in the cell is compromised, mutations in other genes build up, leading to cell overgrowth and possibly tumor formation. The two most common mutations in Caucasian Europeans are exchanges of amino acids (the building blocks of proteins) in the enzyme. One mutation replaces the amino acid tyrosine with cysteine at position 179 (also written as p.Tyr179Cys (p.Y179C)) or, when describing the nucleotide change, written as c.536A>G). The other common mutation switches the amino acid glycine with aspartic acid at position 396 (also written as p.Gly396Asp (G396D) or c.1187G>A)).

The association of the gene with gastric cancer is somewhat indirect and multifactorial. When a subject is infected with Helicobacter pylori (H. pylori), the bacteria cause the formation of free oxygen radicals that are present in the gastric mucosa and this increases the propensity of the genes to incur oxidative damage . A study of 95 cases of patients who had sporadic cancers, initiated by the presence of H. pylori, and two of the 95 patients had biallelic mutation of the MUTYH gene. The somatic missense mutations for the first identified cancer occurred at codon 391, in which there was a change in the nucleotide bases from CCG (codon for amino acid proline) to TCG (codon for amino acid serine), while the second cancer had a nucleotide base change at codon 400 from CAG (codon for amino acid glutamine) to GGG (codon for amino acid arginine). The mutations were found to be highly conserved in the Nudix hydrolase domain of MUTYH. These amino acid mutations provide the basis for the somatic mutations in the gastric system.

Pilomatricoma has been noted in a case that concerned two siblings who were the offspring of consanguineous parents. The siblings had a 2 base pair homozygous insertion on the MUTYH gene ( exon 13). Consequently, a frameshift occurred due to the insertion and a premature stop codon was read at 438 on the gene. Pilomatricoma was the phenotypic manifestation of this mutation. One of the siblings was also found to have rectal adenocarcinoma. It is worthy to note that CTNNB1, a gene associated with pilomatricoma, was also investigated. However, no mutations in this gene were found, thereby dismissing it as a possible cause for this case.

There is an established correlation between aging and the elevation 8-oxoG concentrations, particularly in organs that exhibit reduced cell proliferation such as the kidneys, liver, brain and lungs. Presence of 8-oxoG also occurs in large concentrations in patients with neurological conditions such as Alzheimer's, Parkinson's and Huntington's disease. MUTYH causes immoderate formation of single stranded breaks via base excision repair, under acute oxidative stress conditions. When the 8-oxoguanine species accumulate and increase in concentration in the neurons, MUTYH responds by triggering their degeneration.

== See also ==
- NTHL1
- NEIL1
