= SSBP1 =

Protein-coding gene in the species Homo sapiens

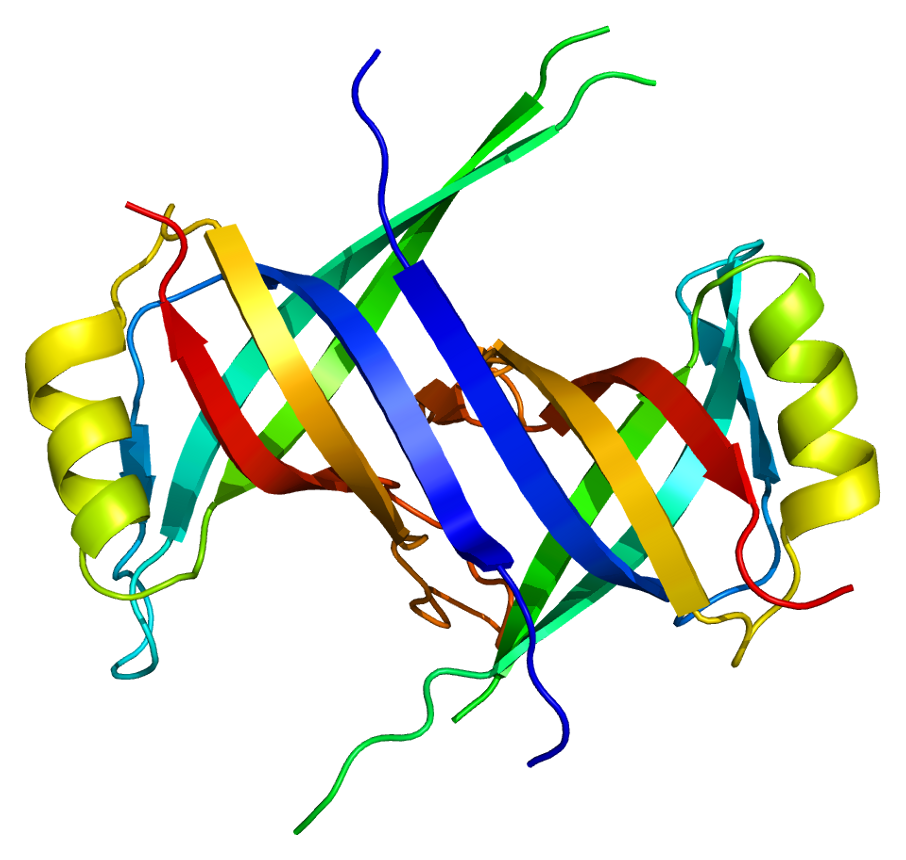

Identifiers
- Aliases: SSBP1, Mt-SSB, SOSS-B1, SSBP, mtSSB, single stranded DNA binding protein 1, OPA13
- External IDs: OMIM: 600439; MGI: 1920040; GeneCards: SSBP1
Available structures
PDB	Ortholog search: PDBe RCSB
PDB	List of PDB id codes 1S3O, 2DUD, 3ULL

Gene location (Human)
Chr.	Chromosome 7 (human)
Band	7q34	Start	141,738,334 bp
Band	7q34	End	141,787,922 bp

Gene location (Mouse)
Chr.	Chromosome 6 (mouse)
Band	6|6 B1	Start	40,448,286 bp
Band	6|6 B1	End	40,461,634 bp
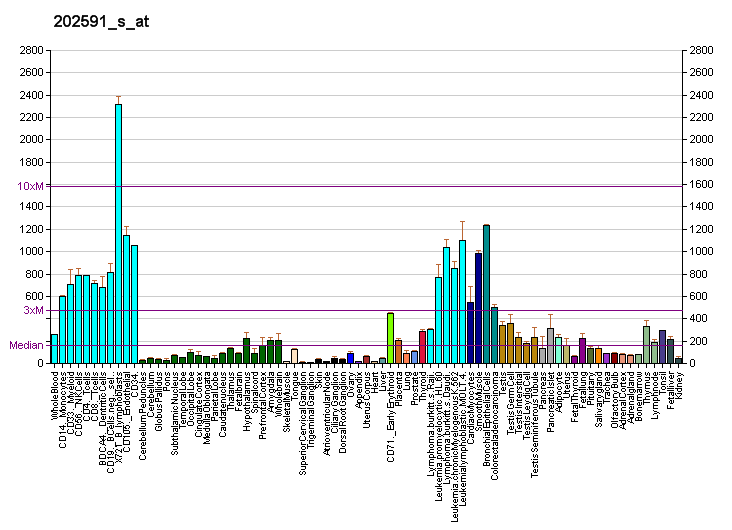
RNA expression pattern
Bgee	Human / Mouse (ortholog); Top expressed in: Achilles tendon; endometrium; islet of Langerhans; smooth muscle tissue; corpus callosum; rectum; monocyte; lymph node; appendix; gastric mucosa / Top expressed in: embryo; embryo; ventricular zone; blastocyst; morula; tail of embryo; right kidney; yolk sac; genital tubercle; muscle of thigh; More reference expression data
BioGPS	More reference expression data
Gene ontology
Molecular function	DNA binding; single-stranded DNA binding; chromatin binding; protein binding; RNA binding
Cellular component	mitochondrial matrix; mitochondrial nucleoid; extracellular exosome; mitochondrion; nucleus; nucleoid
Biological process	DNA replication; mitochondrion organization; mitochondrion morphogenesis; positive regulation of helicase activity; mitochondrial DNA replication
Sources:Amigo / QuickGO
Orthologs
Databases	NCBI: entry; OMA: entry
Species	Human	Mouse
Entrez	6742	381760
Ensembl	ENSG00000262771; ENSG00000106028	ENSMUSG00000029911
UniProt	Q04837	Q9CYR0
RefSeq (mRNA)	NM_001256510; NM_001256511; NM_001256512; NM_001256513; NM_003143	NM_001286663; NM_028358; NM_212468; NM_001364578
RefSeq (protein)	NP_001243439; NP_001243440; NP_001243441; NP_001243442; NP_003134	NP_001273592; NP_082634; NP_997633; NP_001351507
Location (UCSC)	Chr 7: 141.74 – 141.79 Mb	Chr 6: 40.45 – 40.46 Mb
PubMed search
- Wikidata
View/Edit Human	View/Edit Mouse

Single-stranded DNA-binding protein, mitochondrial is a protein that in humans is encoded by the SSBP1 gene.

== Function ==
SSBP 1 is a housekeeping gene involved in mitochondrial biogenesis.

== See also ==
- SSBP4
