= MUTYH-associated polyposis =

- Other names: MYH-associated polyposis
- Specialty: Medical genetics, gastroenterology
- Complications: Colorectal cancer
- Causes: DNA repair gene mutation
- Diagnostic method: Colonoscopy
- Differential diagnosis: Familial adenomatous polyposis, Lynch syndrome
- Treatment: Colonoscopy; Polypectomy
- Frequency: <1%

MUTYH-associated polyposis (also known as MYH-associated polyposis) is an autosomal recessive polyposis syndrome. The disorder is caused by mutations in both alleles (genetic copies) of the DNA repair gene, MUTYH. The MUTYH gene encodes a base excision repair protein, which corrects oxidative damage to DNA. Affected individuals have an increased risk of colorectal cancer, precancerous colon polyps (adenomas) and an increased risk of several additional cancers. About 1–2 percent of the population possess a mutated copy of the MUTYH gene, and less than 1 percent of people have the MUTYH-associated polyposis syndrome. The presence of 10 or more colon adenomas should prompt consideration of MUTYH-associated polyposis, familial adenomatous polyposis and similar syndromes.

== Pathophysiology ==
MUTYH-associated polyposis is caused by a mutation of the MUTYH gene, which is located on chromosome 1. The condition may be caused by identical mutations affecting both copies of the gene (biallelic mutations) or where each allele is affected by different mutations (compound heterozygote).

== Treatment ==
Treatment is similar to familial adenomatous polyposis, which varies based on the extent of polyps.

All first degree relatives of individuals with the condition should undergo screening for MUTYH-associated polyposis. To identify risk for future offspring, screening should be offered to spouses of individuals affected by MUTYH-associated polyposis. If the spouse is a carrier of a mutation in MUTYH, then genetic counseling should be offered to the children as they approach adulthood.

== Epidemiology ==
Without surveillance or screening, between 80 and 90% of individuals with MUTYH-associated polyposis develop colorectal cancer.
