= SSBP4 =

Protein-coding gene in the species Homo sapiens

Identifiers
- Aliases: SSBP4, single stranded DNA binding protein 4
- External IDs: OMIM: 607391; MGI: 1924150; GeneCards: SSBP4

Gene location (Human)
Chr.	Chromosome 19 (human)
Band	19p13.11	Start	18,418,864 bp
Band	19p13.11	End	18,434,562 bp

Gene location (Mouse)
Chr.	Chromosome 8 (mouse)
Band	8|8 B3.3	Start	70,597,490 bp
Band	8|8 B3.3	End	70,608,872 bp
RNA expression pattern
Bgee	Human / Mouse (ortholog); Top expressed in: right uterine tube; anterior pituitary; granulocyte; canal of the cervix; left uterine tube; right frontal lobe; caudate nucleus; nucleus accumbens; body of uterus; right ovary / Top expressed in: neural layer of retina; superior frontal gyrus; dentate gyrus of hippocampal formation granule cell; primary visual cortex; entorhinal cortex; perirhinal cortex; ventricular zone; olfactory tubercle; ankle joint; subiculum; More reference expression data
BioGPS	n/a
Gene ontology
Molecular function	single-stranded DNA binding; DNA binding; RNA polymerase II cis-regulatory region sequence-specific DNA binding; DNA-binding transcription activator activity, RNA polymerase II-specific; protein binding
Cellular component	nucleus
Biological process	transcription by RNA polymerase II; positive regulation of transcription by RNA polymerase II
Sources:Amigo / QuickGO
Orthologs
Databases	NCBI: entry; OMA: entry
Species	Human	Mouse
Entrez	170463	76900
Ensembl	ENSG00000130511	ENSMUSG00000070003
UniProt	Q9BWG4	n/a
RefSeq (mRNA)	NM_001009998; NM_032627	NM_133772
RefSeq (protein)	NP_001009998; NP_116016	n/a
Location (UCSC)	Chr 19: 18.42 – 18.43 Mb	Chr 8: 70.6 – 70.61 Mb
PubMed search
- Wikidata
View/Edit Human	View/Edit Mouse

Single-stranded DNA-binding protein 4 is a protein that in humans is encoded by the SSBP4 gene.
