= PVT1 =

Non-coding RNA in the species Homo sapiens

Identifiers
- Aliases: PVT1, LINC00079, NCRNA00079, onco-lncRNA-100, Pvt1 oncogene (non-protein coding), MYC, MIR1204HG, Pvt1 oncogene, PVT1 long-non-coding RNA, human
- External IDs: OMIM: 165140; GeneCards: PVT1

Gene location (Human)
Chr.	Chromosome 8 (human)
Band	8q24.21	Start	127,794,526 bp
Band	8q24.21	End	128,187,101 bp
RNA expression pattern
Bgee	Human / Mouse (ortholog); Top expressed in: epithelium of colon; left ovary; right ovary; right adrenal gland; right adrenal cortex; left adrenal cortex; tonsil; tendon of biceps brachii; stromal cell of endometrium; lymph node / n/a; More reference expression data
BioGPS	n/a
Orthologs
Databases	NCBI: entry; OMA: entry
Species	Human	Mouse
Entrez	5820	n/a
Ensembl	ENSG00000249859	n/a
UniProt	n a	n/a
RefSeq (mRNA)	n/a	n/a
RefSeq (protein)	n/a	n/a
Location (UCSC)	Chr 8: 127.79 – 128.19 Mb	n/a
PubMed search		n/a
- Wikidata
View/Edit Human

Pvt1 oncogene (non-protein coding), also known as PVT1 or Plasmacytoma Variant Translocation 1, is a long non-coding RNA gene. In mice, this gene was identified as a breakpoint site in chromosome 6;15 translocations. These translocations are associated with murine plasmacytomas. The equivalent translocation in humans is t(2;8), which is associated with a rare variant of Burkitt's lymphoma. In rats, this breakpoint was shown to be a common site of proviral integration in retrovirally induced T lymphomas. Transcription of PVT1 is regulated by Myc.

Overexpression of PVT1 could lead to tumorigenesis in three ways. Rearrangements of DNA through the fusion of PVT1 and Oncogene tumor suppressor could lead to the dysregulation of oncogene or tumor suppressor genes, eventually leading to tumorigenesis. Next, expression of the PVT1-encoded miRNAs can downregulate tumor suppressor genes, causing tumorigenesis. Finally, increase in the interaction of MYC with PVT1 can lead to tumorigenesis.

Overexpression of PVT1 located at 8q24.21 region of the chromosome is associated with many cancers in human through dysregulation of certain different genes in different cancers. For instance, the overexpression of PVT1 in prostate Cancer downregulates the miR-146a gene that leads to a decrease of miR-146a levels in a cell, through the methylation of CpG island on its promoter region, promoting the suppression of the cancer cell apoptosis. Furthermore, activity of lncPVT1 and its associated microRNAs has been shown to influence chemotherapy resistance in multiple cancers by epigenetic regulation or direct repression of other non-coding transcripts.
