= POLE (gene) =

Protein-coding gene in humans

Identifiers
- Aliases: POLE, CRCS12, FILS, POLE1, polymerase (DNA) epsilon, catalytic subunit, DNA polymerase epsilon, catalytic subunit, IMAGEI
- External IDs: OMIM: 174762; MGI: 1196391; GeneCards: POLE
Enzyme activity
EC #	BRENDA	ExPASy	KEGG	MetaCyc
2.7.7.7	↗	↗	↗	↗

Gene location (Human)
Chr.	Chromosome 12 (human)
Band	12q24.33	Start	132,623,753 bp
Band	12q24.33	End	132,687,376 bp

Gene location (Mouse)
Chr.	Chromosome 5 (mouse)
Band	5 F|5 53.45 cM	Start	110,434,172 bp
Band	5 F|5 53.45 cM	End	110,485,340 bp
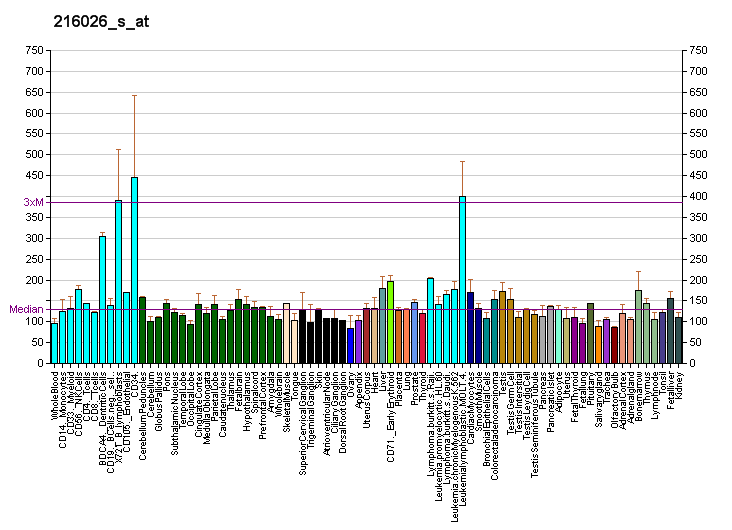
RNA expression pattern
Bgee	Human / Mouse (ortholog); Top expressed in: right hemisphere of cerebellum; right testis; left testis; sural nerve; ventricular zone; spleen; skin of abdomen; skin of leg; ganglionic eminence; right lobe of liver / Top expressed in: otic vesicle; otic placode; saccule; tail of embryo; internal carotid artery; epiblast; genital tubercle; endothelial cell of lymphatic vessel; ventricular zone; maxillary prominence; More reference expression data
BioGPS	More reference expression data
Gene ontology
Molecular function	transferase activity; nucleotide binding; DNA binding; 4 iron, 4 sulfur cluster binding; nucleotidyltransferase activity; iron-sulfur cluster binding; zinc ion binding; chromatin binding; metal ion binding; nucleic acid binding; DNA-directed DNA polymerase activity; single-stranded DNA 3'-5' exodeoxyribonuclease activity; protein binding
Cellular component	plasma membrane; nucleoplasm; nucleus; epsilon DNA polymerase complex
Biological process	nucleotide-excision repair, DNA gap filling; DNA synthesis involved in DNA repair; DNA biosynthetic process; embryonic organ development; nucleic acid phosphodiester bond hydrolysis; cellular response to DNA damage stimulus; base-excision repair, gap-filling; DNA repair; DNA replication; leading strand elongation; DNA replication proofreading; G1/S transition of mitotic cell cycle; mitotic cell cycle; DNA replication initiation; telomere maintenance via semi-conservative replication
Sources:Amigo / QuickGO
Orthologs
Databases	NCBI: entry; OMA: entry
Species	Human	Mouse
Entrez	5426	18973
Ensembl	ENSG00000177084	ENSMUSG00000007080
UniProt	Q07864	Q9WVF7
RefSeq (mRNA)	NM_006231	NM_011132
RefSeq (protein)	NP_006222	NP_035262
Location (UCSC)	Chr 12: 132.62 – 132.69 Mb	Chr 5: 110.43 – 110.49 Mb
PubMed search
- Wikidata
View/Edit Human	View/Edit Mouse

DNA polymerase epsilon catalytic subunit is an enzyme that in humans is encoded by the POLE gene. It is the central catalytic subunit of DNA polymerase epsilon.

== Clinical significance ==
POLE, along with POLD1, has in 2013 been associated with multiple adenoma.

== Interactions ==
POLE has been shown to interact with RAD17.
