= Single-strand DNA-binding protein =

Single-strand DNA-binding protein (SSB) is a protein found in Escherichia coli (E. coli) bacteria, that binds to single-stranded regions of deoxyribonucleic acid (DNA). Single-stranded DNA is produced during all aspects of DNA metabolism: replication, recombination, and repair. As well as stabilizing this single-stranded DNA, SSB proteins bind to and modulate the function of numerous proteins involved in all of these processes.

Active E. coli SSB is composed of four identical 19 kDa subunits. Binding of single-stranded DNA to the tetramer can occur in different "modes", with SSB occupying different numbers of DNA bases depending on a number of factors, including salt concentration. For example, the (SSB)_{65} binding mode, in which approximately 65 nucleotides of DNA wrap around the SSB tetramer and contact all four of its subunits, is favoured at high salt concentrations in vitro. At lower salt concentrations, the (SSB)_{35} binding mode, in which about 35 nucleotides bind to only two of the SSB subunits, tends to form. Further work is required to elucidate the functions of the various binding modes in vivo.

== Bacterial SSB ==
SSB
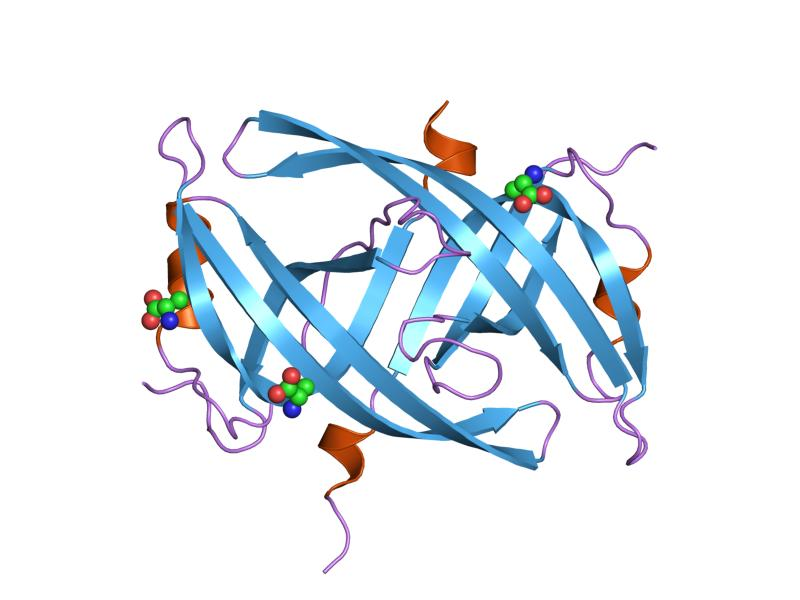
- Crystal structure of PriB- a primosomal DNA replication protein of Escherichia coli

Identifiers
- Symbol: SSB
- Pfam: PF00436
- Pfam clan: CL0021
- InterPro: IPR000424
- PROSITE: PDOC00602
- SCOP2: 1kaw / SCOPe / SUPFAM
- TCDB: 3.A.7
Available protein structures:
- PDB: IPR000424 PF00436 (ECOD; PDBsum)
- AlphaFold: IPR000424; PF00436

SSB protein domains in bacteria are important in its function of maintaining DNA metabolism, more specifically DNA replication, repair, and recombination. It has a structure of three beta-strands to a single six-stranded beta-sheet to form a protein dimer.

== See also ==
- DNA-binding protein
  - Single-stranded binding protein
- Comparison of nucleic acid simulation software
