= Cyclin O =

Protein-coding gene in the species Homo sapiens

CCNO

Identifiers
- Aliases: CCNO, CCNU, CILD29, UDG2, Cyclin O
- External IDs: OMIM: 607752; MGI: 2145534; GeneCards: CCNO

Gene location (Mouse)
Chr.	Chromosome 13 (mouse)
Band	13|13 D2.2	Start	113,124,336 bp
Band	13|13 D2.2	End	113,127,311 bp
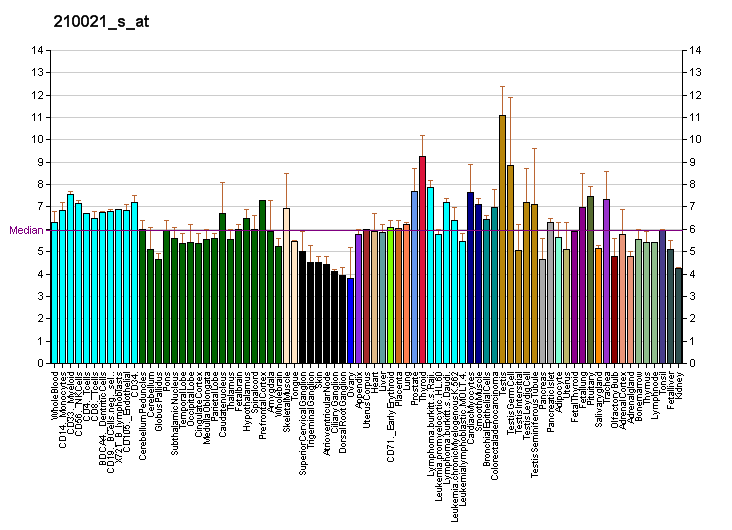
RNA expression pattern
Bgee	Human / Mouse (ortholog); Top expressed in: oocyte; secondary oocyte; bronchial epithelial cell; right uterine tube; body of pancreas; right lobe of thyroid gland; left lobe of thyroid gland; corpus epididymis; anterior pituitary; nucleus accumbens / Top expressed in: primary oocyte; secondary oocyte; zygote; granulocyte; choroid plexus of fourth ventricle; choroidal fissure; embryo; embryo; morula; ovary; More reference expression data
BioGPS	More reference expression data
Gene ontology
Molecular function	uracil DNA N-glycosylase activity; protein kinase activity; cyclin-dependent protein serine/threonine kinase regulator activity; protein kinase binding
Cellular component	cytoplasm; nucleus; cyclin-dependent protein kinase holoenzyme complex
Biological process	cell projection organization; multi-ciliated epithelial cell differentiation; cilium assembly; mitotic cell cycle; cell cycle; cell division; regulation of cyclin-dependent protein serine/threonine kinase activity; protein phosphorylation; regulation of mitotic nuclear division; positive regulation of cell population proliferation; positive regulation of cell cycle; mitotic cell cycle phase transition
Sources:Amigo / QuickGO
Orthologs
Databases	NCBI: entry
Species	Human	Mouse
Entrez	10309	218630
Ensembl	n/a	ENSMUSG00000042417
UniProt	P22674	P0C242
RefSeq (mRNA)	NM_001024592; NM_021147	NM_001081062
RefSeq (protein)	NP_066970	NP_001074531
Location (UCSC)	n/a	Chr 13: 113.12 – 113.13 Mb
PubMed search
- Wikidata
View/Edit Human	View/Edit Mouse

Cyclin-O is a protein that in humans is encoded by the CCNO gene.

== Interactions ==
Cyclin O has been shown to interact with RPA2 and PCNA.
