= Vaginal atresia =

Abnormal closure or absence of the vagina

Vaginal atresia is a condition in which the vagina is abnormally closed or absent. The main causes can either be complete vaginal hypoplasia, or a vaginal obstruction, often caused by an imperforate hymen or, less commonly, a transverse vaginal septum. It results in uterovaginal outflow tract obstruction. This condition does not usually occur by itself within an individual, but coupled with other developmental disorders within the individual. The disorders that are usually coupled with a female who has vaginal atresia are Mayer–Rokitansky–Küster–Hauser syndrome, Bardet–Biedl syndrome, or Fraser syndrome. One out of every 5,000 women have this abnormality.

== Symptoms and signs ==
Symptoms and signs in the newborn can be sepsis, abdominal mass, and respiratory distress. Other abdominopelvic or perineal congenital anomalies frequently prompt radiographic evaluation in the newborn, resulting in a diagnosis of coincident vaginal atresia. Symptoms for vaginal atresia include cyclical abdominal pain, the inability to start having menstrual cycles, a small pouch or dimple where a vaginal opening should be, and pelvic mass when the upper vagina becomes filled with menstrual blood. Signs and symptoms of vaginal atresia or vaginal agenesis can often go unnoticed in females until they reach the age of menstruation. Women may also experience some form of abdominal pain or cramping.

== Causes ==
Vaginal atresia arises from a specific defect in the embryological development of the lower female reproductive tract. During normal female development, the paired Müllerian ducts give rise to the fallopian tubes, uterus, cervix, and upper vagina, while the urogenital sinus forms the lower vagina. The precise contributions of each structure to vaginal formation remain a subject of debate, with the most widely accepted model suggests that the Müllerian ducts contribute the upper two-thirds and the urogenital sinus the lower one-third. In vaginal atresia, the urogenital sinus fails to contribute to the caudal vaginal segment. The lower one-fifth to one-third of the vagina is replaced by approximately 2–3cm of fibrous tissue, above which the upper vagina, cervix, uterine corpus, and fallopian tubes typically remain well-differentiated. Normal vaginal development is complete by approximately 20 weeks of gestation. The molecular and genetic mechanisms underlying vaginal atresia have not been fully understood.

== Related Disorders ==
=== Mayer–Rokitansky–Küster–Hauser syndrome ===
Müllerian agenesis, also known as Mayer–Rokitansky–Küster–Hauser (MRKH) syndrome, is a congenital disorder in females where the uterus and the upper two-thirds of the vagina are absent or underdeveloped. Affected individuals are genetically female, with 46,XX chromosomes, reflecting typical female genetic makeup. Kidney anomalies, such as renal agenesis, cysts, or ectopic kidneys, frequently accompany this disorder due to the close embryological development of the reproductive and urinary systems. Additionally, abnormal androgen production may also occur, resulting in hyperandrogenism and Müllerian aplasia.

This condition affects approximately 1 in every 4,000 to 5,000 females and is often diagnosed during adolescence when menstrual periods are absent, despite normal ovarian function and secondary sexual features development.

=== Bardet–Biedl syndrome ===
Bardet–Biedl syndrome (BBS) is a ciliopathic human genetic disorder that can affect various parts of the body. Parts of the urogenital system where the effects of BBS are seen include: ectopic urethra, kidney failure, uterus duplex, hypogonadism, septate vagina, and hypoplasia of the fallopian tubes, uterus, ovaries. Some of the common characteristics associated with this syndrome include intellectual disorders, loss of vision, kidney problems, and obesity.

The mechanism that causes BBS remains unclear. Mutations in more than 20 genes can cause BBS, which is an inherited recessive condition. Some of the gene mutations that occur in BBS are listed below:

BBS1, BBS2, ARL6 (BBS3), BBS4, BBS5, MKKS (BBS6), BBS7, TTC8 (BBS8), BBS9, BBS10, TRIM32 (BBS11), BBS12, MKS1 (BBS13), CEP290 (BBS14), WDPCP (BBS15), SDCCAG8 (BBS16), LZTFL1 (BBS17), BBIP1 (BBS18), IFT27 (BBS19), IFT172 (BBS20), CFAP418 (BBS21), and IFT74 (BBS22) Most genes associated with BBS encode proteins that are related structures called cilia and basal bodies.

=== Fraser syndrome ===
Fraser syndrome is a rare autosomal recessive disorder that disrupts development before birth, characterised by cryptophthalmos, cutaneous syndactyly, and abnormalities of the urinary tract, most often renal agenesis. Genital malformations are common and account for its association with vaginal atresia. In affected females these may include vaginal atresia and, less commonly, hypoplasia or agenesis of the vagina and uterus.

=== McKusick–Kaufman syndrome ===
McKusick–Kaufman syndrome typically presents with vaginal atresia and is often linked to other anomalies such as imperforate anus, congenital heart defects which can vary in severity and type, hydrometrocolpos (fluid buildup in the uterus and vaginal canal due to outflow obstruction), and polydactyly. Despite these issues, secondary sexual features like breast development and pubic hair typically still develop during puberty.

== Mechanism ==
The exact mechanism for vaginal atresia is not well known, as specific molecular mechanisms which lead to the closing or absence of the vagina are unclear. There are various pathways that may support or restrict regular vaginal development. Research has shown that changing factors may also include paracrine and autocrine signals and changes in the basis of developing organs. Specific patterns of genetic transmission have not been identified for this condition. Normal reproductive organ production requires timely coordination of the following systems: external genitalia, internal ductal system, and gonadal structure. The abnormal development of the vagina results in an incomplete unit (low, mid, high transverse septum), failure of epithelium degeneration (imperforate hymen), and vaginal atresia.

According to a number of medical professionals, timely coordination of interdependent systems is required for normal reproductive organ development in both males and females. The description of vaginal atresia mechanism can be explained in several steps of development of the uterovaginal canal per the information provided by these medical professionals. These interdependent systems are external genitalia, gonadal structures, and internal ductal system. The absence of androgens, Müllerian-inhibiting substance (MIS), and testes causes the continuous differentiation of the Müllerian ducts with reversion of the Wolffian ducts in the female embryo. The Müllerian duct will then elongate to reach the urogenital sinus within 9 weeks of gestation; this forms the uterovaginal canal. By 15–26 weeks of gestation, cephalic growth of the sinovaginal bulb is completed. The vaginal plate is also formed from the fusion of vaginal cord with the sinovaginal bulb.

The formation of the uterovaginal canal is thought to occur from the caudal to the cephalic portion, all while the urogenital sinus is used to create the epithelial lining. Development of the vagina is completed by the fifth month of gestation. While the mesenchyme that surrounds the structures transitions into musculature of the genital tract, the fallopian tubes are formed via the cephalic remnants of the Müllerian duct. This developmental process attributes to the process of how proper vaginal development takes place. Failure of the septum to regress between the fused Müllerian ducts results in a septate uterus. The incomplete fusion of the Müllerian ducts attributes to the formation of arcuate, bicornuate, or didelphid uteri.

Females who have both Rokitansky-Mayer-Küster-Hauser syndrome and uterovaginal atresia are theorized to have a failing caudal development within the Müllerian ducts. Variations of transverse vaginal septum might be described by the malfunctions at the level of the vaginal plate. Though the Müllerian and urogenital sinuses play a huge role in the derivation of the vagina, it is unclear how much of a role each of these play normal vaginal development.

== Diagnosis ==
Vaginal atresia can sometimes be diagnosed by physical examination soon after birth. A child with vaginal atresia often has other congenital abnormalities and other tests such as X-ray and tests to evaluate the kidneys are done. Findings in adolescents may include abdominal pain, difficulty voiding, and backache, but most present with amenorrhea. Difficulties with sexual intercourse can suggest atresia. In the event that the condition is not caught shortly after birth, vaginal atresia becomes more evident when no menstrual cycle has occurred If vaginal atresia is suspected by the doctor, a blood test may also be requested for any of the previously mentioned signs and symptoms, a magnetic resonance imaging (MRI) test, or an ultrasound. A regular evaluation of children born with an imperforate anus or anorectal malformation should be paired with the assessment of the results from these tests.

Table: Summary of diagnostic methods used specifically for vaginal atresia
Diagnostic Method	Purpose in Diagnosing Vaginal Atresia	Advantages	Limitations
Pelvic ultrasound	Used as an initial imaging tool to assess the presence of fluid build-up (hematocolpos) or cyclic pain or lack of periods (hematometra) caused by menstrual blockage in adolescents; can also evaluate uterine and renal anatomy	Non-invasive, cost-effective, and widely available; useful for identifying fluid accumulation and guiding further tests	May not clearly visualize the extent or exact location of the atresia; less effective for detailed soft tissue anatomy
Magnetic Resonance Imaging (MRI)	Provides detailed multiplanar images of the vagina, uterus, ovaries, and renal system; distinguishes between partial and complete atresia; useful in surgical planning	High-resolution, excellent soft tissue contrast; gold standard for anatomical mapping of congenital anomalies	Expensive; not always accessible in low-resource settings
Diagnostic laparoscopy	Used when non-invasive imaging is inconclusive; allows direct visualization of pelvic anatomy and detection of complications like endometriosis or hematosalpinx	Offers visual confirmation of internal reproductive structures; useful for combined diagnosis and intervention	Invasive; requires anesthesia and surgical setup
Hormonal testing	Helps rule out endocrine causes of primary amenorrhea by evaluating levels of luteinizing hormone, follicle stimulating hormone, prolactin, estradiol, and thyroid hormones	Useful in narrowing differential diagnoses and confirming normal ovarian function	Does not provide direct anatomical information
Karyotyping	Performed to confirm 46,XX chromosomal status and rule out conditions such as androgen insensitivity syndrome or Turner syndrome	Clarifies underlying genetic causes and differentiates from other causes of absent menstruation	Time-consuming; not diagnostic of atresia on its own
Clinical examination	Physical inspection may reveal an absent or shortened vaginal canal, especially in neonates or adolescents with amenorrhea or failed tampon use	Quick and accessible; can raise early suspicion of vaginal atresia	Findings may be subtle or missed without further imaging; can be distressing if not handled sensitively

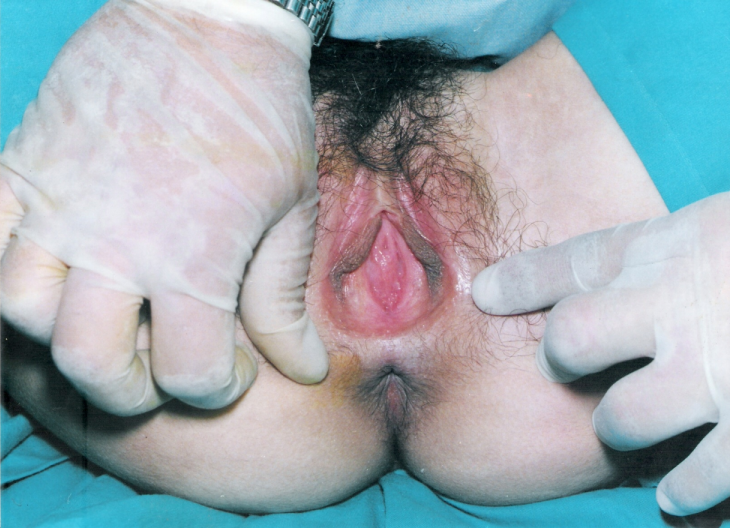
Woman with Müllerian agenesis exhibiting vaginal agenesis

== Treatment ==
There are several methods of treatment for individuals with vaginal atresia. The first method of treatment that is recommended would be self-dilation of the vagina. A doctor may first recommend that the patient first attempts to create a vagina themselves through the process of self-dilation. The self dilation technique consists of using vaginal dilators, which are small round tubes that vary in size and are similar in size and shape to tampons. Vaginal dilators may be pressed alongside the vaginal area on a regular basis in order to further open the vaginal canal. Frank's procedure is a technique that used a progressive series of vaginal dilators that are inserted into the dimple of the vagina while using pressure. This will widen any space that exists between the bladder and the rectum. Frank's procedure can be performed directly by the patient, therefore requiring no surgery or anesthesia. The procedure/technique can take months to complete, with regular compliance necessary. The overall success rate for females who use Frank's procedure is 80%. If this procedure does not work, then surgery would be the next method of treatment. Another alternative form of treatment would be surgery, or the creation of a new vagina.

== Prognosis ==
The prognosis for vaginal atresia is one that is complicated. There are variations in patients' anatomic findings as well as an absence in consistent surgical techniques which makes it difficult to give a prognosis for this condition. Along with other conditions that give rise to an abnormal perineum (i.e. ambiguous genitalia and other various abnormalities that range from cloaca to urogenital sinus), individuals with vaginal atresia often report reconstruction as an outcome of treatment. Due to this, it is difficult to compare outcomes between individuals with vaginal atresia.

=== Rokitansky–Mayer–Küster–Hauser syndrome ===
Fertility options for girls and women with Rokitansky–Mayer–Küster–Hauser syndrome has a bit more information. Girls and women who are born without a complete vagina, but still have a regular sized uterus more than likely will be able to become pregnant and have a baby. However, if the female is born with a tiny uterus, or without a uterus, they will not be able to have a baby. As the ovaries may be normal in this case, the egg may be fertilized with a donor's or partner's sperm. In this case, surrogacy, would be an option where there will be a gestational carrier to carry the pregnancy for the couple. Adoption may also be an option for females with Rokitansky–Mayer–Küster–Hauser syndrome. Another possibility could be uterine transplants, however this a new and developing form of treatment. Fertility options are being researched daily, so there can always be a new method available.

Any pain associated with Rokitansky–Mayer–Küster–Hauser syndrome comes from menstruation related cramping and can be treated with several ways. Individuals with this syndrome may be born with a uterine remnant (tiny uterus), which can become filled with blood in the pelvic cavity causing pain. A medical professional can assess the severity of having a uterine remnant within each patient to determine if removal of the uterus is necessary.

=== Bardet–Biedl syndrome ===
There is no cure available for individuals with Bardet–Biedl syndrome; however, there are methods of treatment for some of the signs and symptoms within each individual. Corrective surgery of malformation related to the disorder may be an option for treatment. Genetic counseling can also be beneficial to families with this disorder.

== Psychosocial outcomes ==
Adolescents and women diagnosed with vaginal atresia often experience a range of psychosocial challenges, particularly surrounding identity, sexuality, and fertility. The psychological impact is frequently profound, as diagnosis typically coincides with puberty or adolescence, a critical period of identity formation. Feelings of shock, grief, and confusion are common, especially when accompanied by the discovery of infertility and anatomical differences.

In one of the earliest studies on this topic, Lutz et al. (1977) reported that women treated for vaginal agenesis often experienced depression, low self-esteem, and emotional withdrawal following diagnosis. These emotional difficulties were often intensified by concerns about future sexual relationships and the inability to menstruate or bear children. The study noted that family dynamics played a significant role in psychological adjustment, with supportive and communicative families associated with more positive outcomes.

More recent research by Callens et al. (2009) focused on individuals with Mayer–Rokitansky–Küster–Hauser syndrome, a leading cause of vaginal atresia. The study found that although many participants eventually adapted well to their diagnosis, challenges related to self-image, disclosure in relationships, and understanding their own sexual health persisted. The authors emphasized the importance of early psychological support, access to peer networks, and clear, respectful communication from healthcare providers.

Despite the difficulties, individuals with vaginal atresia can go on to lead fulfilling lives. Interventions such as vaginal dilation or vaginoplasty, when paired with counseling and community support, are associated with improved mental health, body confidence, and relationship satisfaction. Long-term outcomes are especially positive when treatment plans address both physical and emotional needs from the beginning.
