= Coiled coil =

Structural motif in proteins

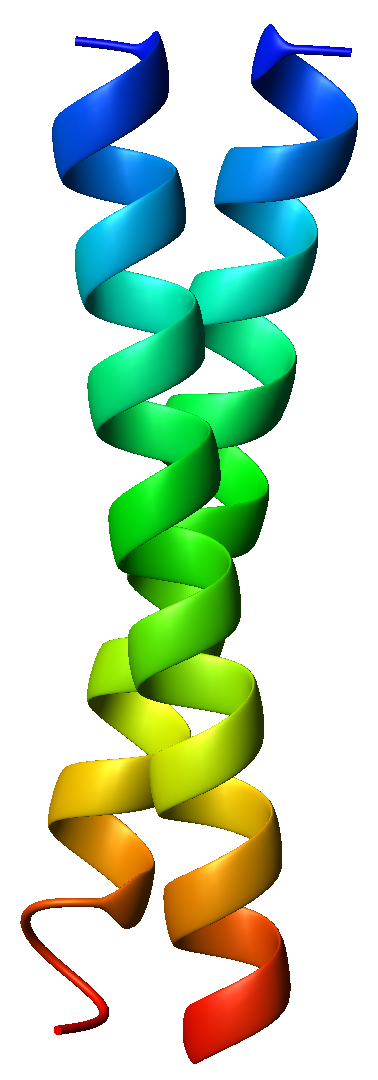
Figure 1: The classic example of a coiled coil is the GCN4 leucine zipper (PDB accession code 1zik), which is a parallel, left-handed homodimer. However, many other types of coiled coil exist.

A coiled coil is a structural motif in proteins in which two to seven alpha-helices are coiled together like the strands of a rope. (Dimers and trimers are the most common types.) They have been found in roughly 5-10% of proteins and have a variety of functions. They are one of the most widespread motifs found in protein-protein interactions. To aid protein study, several tools have been developed to predict coiled-coils in protein structures. Many coiled coil-type proteins are involved in important biological functions, such as the regulation of gene expression — e.g., transcription factors. Notable examples are the oncoproteins c-Fos and c-Jun, as well as the muscle protein tropomyosin.

== Discovery ==
The possibility of coiled coils for α-keratin was initially somewhat controversial. Linus Pauling and Francis Crick independently came to the conclusion that this was possible at about the same time. In the summer of 1952, Pauling visited the laboratory in England where Crick worked. Pauling and Crick met and spoke about various topics; at one point, Crick asked whether Pauling had considered coiled coils (a term Crick came up with), to which Pauling said he had. Upon returning to the United States, Pauling resumed research on the topic. He concluded that coiled coils exist, and submitted a lengthy manuscript to the journal Nature in October. Pauling's son Peter Pauling worked at the same lab as Crick, and mentioned the report to him. Crick believed that Pauling had stolen his idea, and submitted a shorter note to Nature a few days after Pauling's manuscript arrived. Eventually, after some controversy and frequent correspondences, Crick's lab declared that the idea had been reached independently by both researchers, and that no intellectual theft had occurred. In his note (which was published first due to its shorter length), Crick proposed the coiled coil and as well as mathematical methods for determining their structure. Remarkably, this was soon after the structure of the alpha helix was suggested in 1951 by Linus Pauling and coworkers. These studies were published in the absence of knowledge of a keratin sequence. The first keratin sequences were determined by Hanukoglu and Fuchs in 1982.

Based on sequence and secondary structure prediction analyses identified the coiled-coil domains of keratins. These models have been confirmed by structural analyses of coiled-coil domains of keratins.

== Molecular structure ==
Coiled coils usually contain a repeated pattern, hxxhcxc, of hydrophobic (h) and charged (c) amino-acid residues, referred to as a heptad repeat. The positions in the heptad repeat are usually labeled abcdefg, where a and d are the hydrophobic positions, often being occupied by isoleucine, leucine, or valine. Folding a sequence with this repeating pattern into an alpha-helical secondary structure causes the hydrophobic residues to be presented as a 'stripe' that coils gently around the helix in left-handed fashion, forming an amphipathic structure. The most favorable way for two such helices to arrange themselves in the water-filled environment of the cytoplasm is to wrap the hydrophobic strands against each other sandwiched between the hydrophilic amino acids. Thus, it is the burial of hydrophobic surfaces that provides the thermodynamic driving force for the oligomerization. The packing in a coiled-coil interface is exceptionally tight, with almost complete van der Waals contact between the side-chains of the a and d residues. This tight packing was originally predicted by Francis Crick in 1952 and is referred to as knobs into holes packing.

The α-helices may be parallel or anti-parallel, and usually adopt a left-handed super-coil (Figure 1). Although disfavored, a few right-handed coiled coils have also been observed in nature and in designed proteins.

== Biological roles ==
As coiled-coil domains are common among a significant amount of proteins in a wide variety of protein families, they help proteins fulfill various functions in the cell. Their primary feature is to facilitate protein-protein interaction and keep proteins or domains interlocked. This feature corresponds to several subfunctions, including membrane fusion, molecular spacing, oligomerization tags, vesicle movement, aid in movement proteins, cell structure, and more.

=== Membrane fusion ===
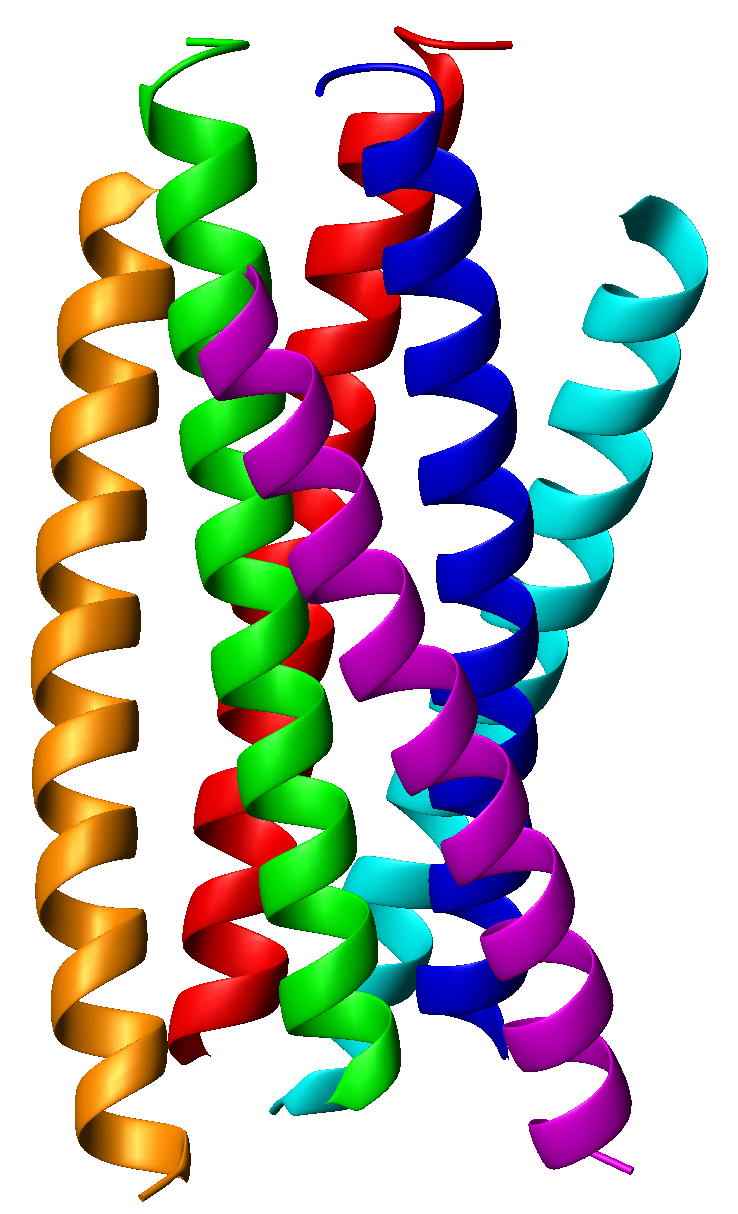
Side view of the gp41 hexamer that initiates the entry of HIV into its target cell.

A coiled coil domain plays a role in human immunodeficiency virus type 1 (HIV-1) infection. Viral entry into CD4-positive cells commences when three subunits of a glycoprotein 120 (gp120) bind to CD4 receptor and a coreceptor. Glycoprotein gp120 is closely associated with a trimer of gp41 via van der Waals interactions. Eventually, the gp41 N-terminal fusion peptide sequence anchors into the host cell. A spring-loaded mechanism is responsible for bringing the viral and cell membranes in close enough proximity that they will fuse. The origin of the spring-loaded mechanism lies within the exposed gp41, which contains two consecutive heptad repeats (HR1 and HR2) following the fusion peptide at the N terminus of the protein. HR1 forms a parallel, trimeric coiled coil onto which HR2 region coils, forming the trimer-of-hairpins (or six-helix bundle) structure, thereby facilitating membrane fusion through bringing the membranes close to each other. The virus then enters the cell and begins its replication. Recently, inhibitors derived from HR2 such as Fuzeon (DP178, T-20) that bind to the HR1 region on gp41 have been developed. However, peptides derived from HR1 have little viral inhibition efficacy due to the propensity for these peptides to aggregate in solution. Chimeras of these HR1-derived peptides with GCN4 leucine zippers have been developed and have shown to be more active than Fuzeon. Human immunodeficiency virus type 2 has a membrane envelope glycoprotein with similar structure to HIV-1 gp41, but containing substitutions for a glycine amino acid residue in the coiled coil domain that may impact trimer stability.

The proteins SNAP-25, synaptobrevin, and syntaxin-1 have alpha-helices which interact with each other to form a coiled-coil SNARE complex. Zippering the domains together provides the necessary energy for vesicle fusion to occur.

=== Molecular spacers ===
The coiled-coil motif may also act as a spacer between two objects within a cell. The lengths of these molecular spacer coiled-coil domains are highly conserved. The purpose of these molecular spacers may be to separate protein domains, thus keeping them from interacting, or to separate vesicles within the cell to mediate vesicle transport. An example of this first purpose is Omp‐α found in T. maritima. Other proteins keep vesicles apart, such as p115, giantin, and GM130 which interact with each other via coiled-coil motifs and act as a tether between the Golgi and a nearby vesicle. The family of proteins related to this activity of tethering vesicles to the Golgi are known as golgins. Finally, there are several proteins with coiled-coil domains involved in the kinetochore, which keeps chromosomes separated during cell division. These proteins include Ndc-80, and Nuf2p. Related proteins interact with microtubules during cell division, of which mutation leads to cell death.

=== As oligomerization tags ===
Because of their specific interaction coiled coils can be used as "tags" to stabilize or enforce a specific oligomerization state. A coiled coil interaction has been observed to drive the oligomerization of the BBS2 and BBS7 subunits of the BBSome. Because coiled-coils generally interact with other coiled coils, they are found in proteins which are required to form dimers or tetramers with more copies of themselves. Because of their ability in driving protein oligomerization, they have also been studied in their use in forming synthetic nanostructures.

== Design ==
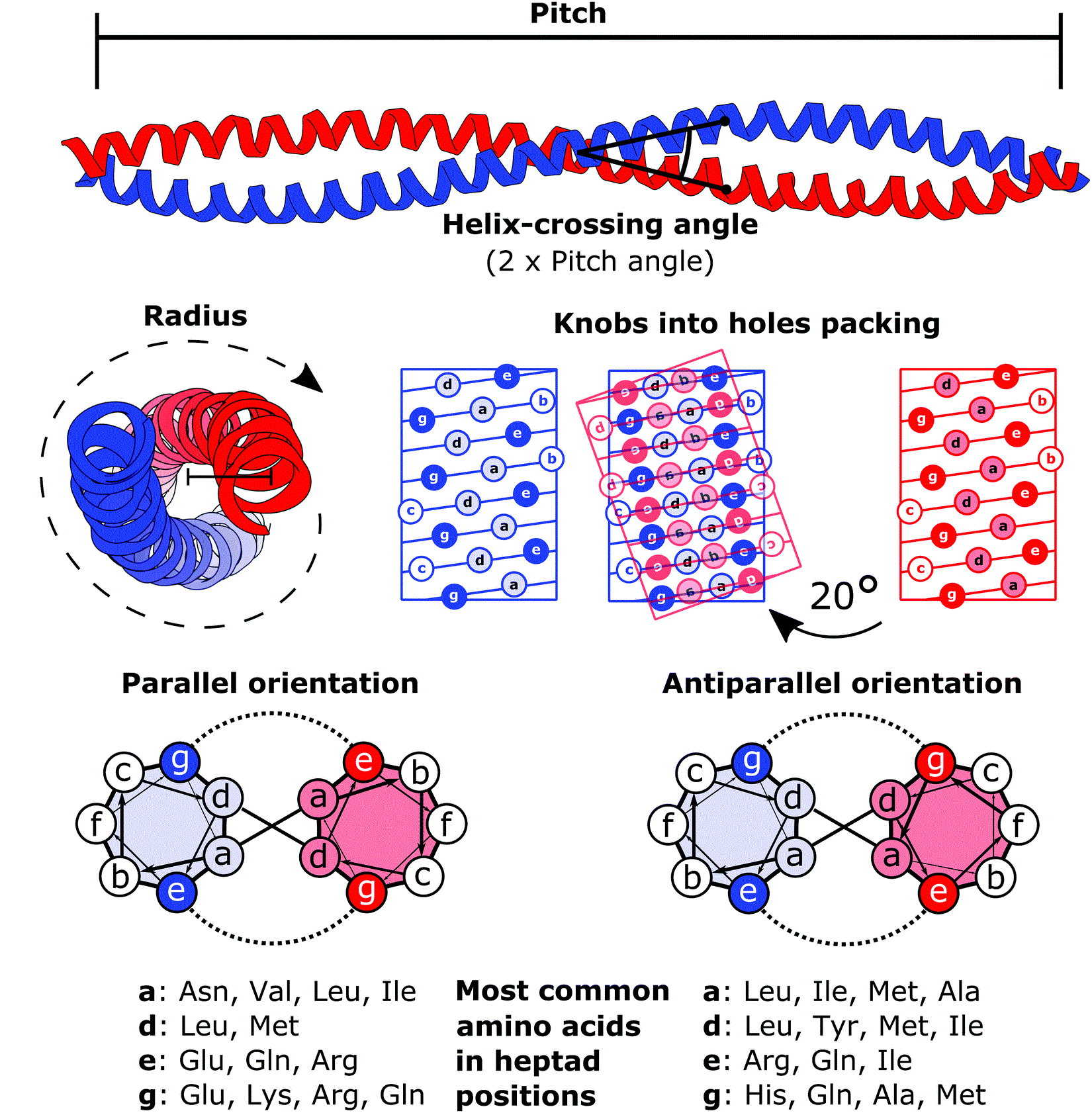
Secondary and tertiary structure of the coiled-coil motif. The heptad repeat often consists of specific amino acids, seen in the figure. Knobs into holes packing is also shown.

The general problem of deciding on the folded structure of a protein when given the amino acid sequence (the so-called protein folding problem) has only been solved partially. However, the coiled coil is one of a relatively small number of folding motifs for which the relationships between the sequence and the final folded structure are comparatively well understood. Harbury et al. performed a landmark study using an archetypal coiled coil, GCN4, in which rules that govern the way that peptide sequence affects the oligomeric state (that is, the number of alpha-helices in the final assembly) were established. The GCN4 coiled coil is a 31-amino-acid (which equates to just over four heptads) parallel, dimeric (i.e., consisting of two alpha-helices) coiled coil and has a repeated isoleucine (or I, in single-letter code) and leucine (L) at the a and d positions, respectively, and forms a dimeric coiled coil. When the amino acids in the a and d positions were changed from I at a and L at d to I at a and I at d, a trimeric (three alpha-helices) coiled coil was formed. Furthermore, switching the positions of L to a and I to d resulted in the formation of a tetrameric (four alpha-helices) coiled coil. These represent a set of rules for the determination of coiled coil oligomeric states and allows scientists to effectively "dial-in" the oligomerization behavior. Another aspect of coiled coil assembly that is relatively well understood, at least in the case of dimeric coiled coils, is that placing a polar residue (in particular asparagine, N) at opposing a positions forces parallel assembly of the coiled coil. This effect is due to a self-complementary hydrogen bonding between these residues, which would go unsatisfied if an N were paired with, for instance, an L on the opposing helix.

It was recently demonstrated by Peacock, Pikramenou and co-workers that coiled coils may be self-assembled using lanthanide(III) ions as a template, thus producing novel imaging agents.

== Biomedical applications ==
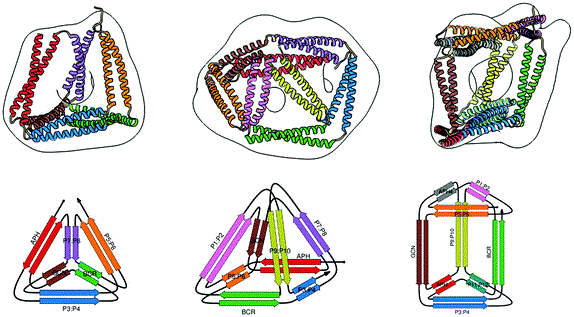
Some examples of protein nanostructures made using coiled-coil motifs. The top three pictures shown in the figure more accurately models the nanostructure, while the pictures underneath describe their basic shape. These may be used as building blocks to create further nanostructures.

Coiled-coil motifs have been experimented on as possible building block for nanostructures, in part because of their simple design and wide range of function based primarily on facilitating protein-protein interaction. Simple guidelines for de novo synthesis of new proteins containing coiled-coil domains have led to many applications being hypothesized, including drug delivery, regenerating tissue, protein origami, and much more. In regards to drug delivery, coiled-coil domains would help overcome some of the hazards of chemotherapeutic drugs, by keeping them from leaking into healthy tissue as they are transported to their target. Coiled-coil domains can be made to bind to specific proteins or cell surface markers, allowing for more precise targeting in drug delivery. Other functions would be to help store and transport drugs within the body that would otherwise degrade rapidly, by creating nanotubes and other structure svia the interlocking of coiled-coil motifs. By utilizing the function of oligomerization of proteins via coiled-coil domains, antigen display can be amplified in vaccines, increasing their effectiveness.

The oligomerization of coiled-coil motifs allows for the creation of protein origami and protein building blocks. Metal-ligand interactions, covalent bonds, and ionic interactions have been studied to manipulate possible coiled-coil interactions in this field of study. Several different nanostructures can be made by combining coiled-coil motifs such that they are self-assembling building blocks. However, several difficulties remain with stability. Using peptides with coiled-coil motifs for scaffolding has made it easier to create 3D structures for cell culturing. 3D hydrogels can be made with these peptides, and then cells may be loaded into the matrix. This has applications in the study of tissue, tissue engineering, and more.
