= McKusick =

McKusick may refer to:

People with the surname McKusick:

- Blaine McKusick (1888–1960), American football and basketball coach
- Hal McKusick (1924–2012), American jazz musician
- James C. McKusick, author of Green Writing: Romanticism and Ecology
- John McKusick (1815–1900), American lumberman, politician, and pioneer
- Marshall Kirk McKusick (born 1954), American computer scientist, brother of James C. McKusick
- Victor A. McKusick (1921–2008), pioneering American medical geneticist, twin brother of Vincent McKusick
- Vincent L. McKusick (1921–2014), American Chief Justice of Maine, twin brother of Victor McKusick

== See also ==
- Lake McKusick, a lake in Minnesota
- Carroll L. McKusick Elementary School, Guilford, Maine, named for the father of Victor and Vincent McKusick
- McKusick–Kaufman syndrome
- The University of South Dakota's McKusick Law Library
