= Perineal dilator =

Inflatable balloon-like device

A perineal dilator is an inflatable balloon-like device sometimes used to create a functional vagina in women with vaginal agenesis. The device, usually made out of silicone, is inserted into the vagina and inflated.
