= McKissack =

McKissack may refer to:

== People ==
- Dick McKissack (1926–1982), American football player and politician.
- Eliza Jane McKissack (1828–1900), founding head of music at the University of North Texas College of Music
- Fredrick McKissack (1939–2013), American author of children's books
- Jefferson Davis McKissack (1903–1980), Texas folk artist and creator of The Orange Show
- Moses McKissack III (1879–1952), African American architect
- Patricia McKissack (née Patricia L'Ann Carwell; born 1944), American author of books
- Perri Alette McKissack (born 1966), also known as Perri Nixon and as Pebbles, American dance-pop and urban contemporary singer-songwriter

== Other ==
- McKissack & McKissack, an architectural firm in Nashville
- McKissack Ponds, a small lake in Franklin County, Florida

== See also ==
- McKissic
- McKissick (disambiguation)
- MacKessack (disambiguation)
- McKusick
