= BBS1 =

Protein

Identifiers
- Aliases: BBS1, BBS2L2, Bardet-Biedl syndrome 1
- External IDs: OMIM: 209901; MGI: 1277215; GeneCards: BBS1

Gene location (Human)
Chr.	Chromosome 11 (human)
Band	11q13.2	Start	66,510,606 bp
Band	11q13.2	End	66,533,613 bp

Gene location (Mouse)
Chr.	Chromosome 19 (mouse)
Band	19|19 A	Start	4,936,906 bp
Band	19|19 A	End	4,956,656 bp
RNA expression pattern
Bgee	Human / Mouse (ortholog); Top expressed in: right uterine tube; left ovary; pituitary gland; right ovary; right lobe of thyroid gland; right hemisphere of cerebellum; body of uterus; anterior pituitary; left lobe of thyroid gland; right frontal lobe / Top expressed in: neural layer of retina; otolith organ; spermatocyte; utricle; Epithelium of choroid plexus; substantia nigra; olfactory epithelium; pineal gland; habenula; piriform cortex; More reference expression data
BioGPS	n/a
Gene ontology
Molecular function	smoothened binding; patched binding; protein binding
Cellular component	cytoplasm; ciliary basal body; cytosol; centrosome; cell projection; BBSome; membrane; plasma membrane; cilium; microtubule organizing center; ciliary membrane; axoneme; cytoskeleton
Biological process	response to stimulus; retina homeostasis; cell projection organization; protein localization to cilium; protein transport; photoreceptor cell maintenance; visual perception; Golgi to plasma membrane protein transport; cilium assembly; non-motile cilium assembly; sensory perception of smell
Sources:Amigo / QuickGO
Orthologs
Databases	NCBI: entry; OMA: entry
Species	Human	Mouse
Entrez	582	52028
Ensembl	ENSG00000174483	ENSMUSG00000006464
UniProt	Q8NFJ9	Q3V3N7
RefSeq (mRNA)	NM_024649	NM_001033128
RefSeq (protein)	NP_078925	NP_001028300
Location (UCSC)	Chr 11: 66.51 – 66.53 Mb	Chr 19: 4.94 – 4.96 Mb
PubMed search
- Wikidata
View/Edit Human	View/Edit Mouse

Bardet–Biedl syndrome 1 protein is a protein that in humans is encoded by the BBS1 gene. BBS1 is part of the BBSome complex, which required for ciliogenesis. Mutations in this gene have been observed in patients with the major form (type 1) of Bardet–Biedl syndrome.

== History ==
As of 2008, research results indicated that the encoded protein may play a role in eye, limb, cardiac and reproductive system development.
