= CCDC28B =

Protein found in humans

Identifiers
- Aliases: CCDC28B, coiled-coil domain containing 28B
- External IDs: OMIM: 610162; MGI: 1913514; HomoloGene: 11509; GeneCards: CCDC28B; OMA:CCDC28B - orthologs

Gene location (Human)
Chr.	Chromosome 1 (human)
Band	1p35.2	Start	32,200,595 bp
Band	1p35.2	End	32,205,453 bp

Gene location (Mouse)
Chr.	Chromosome 4 (mouse)
Band	4|4 D2.2	Start	129,513,067 bp
Band	4|4 D2.2	End	129,517,740 bp
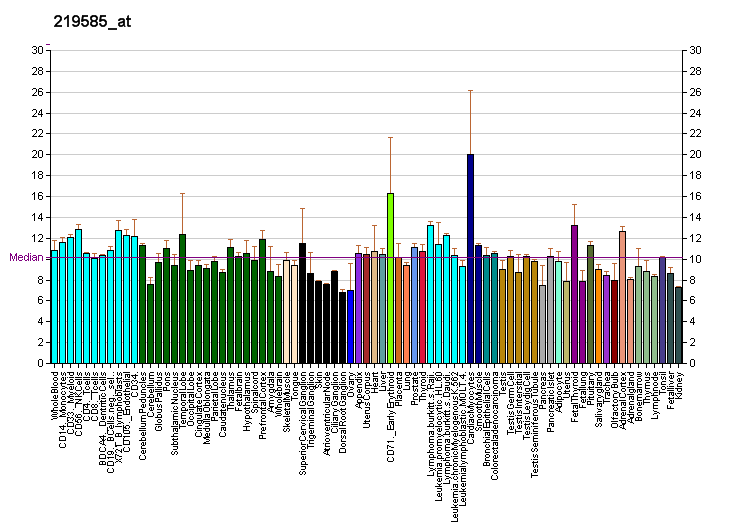

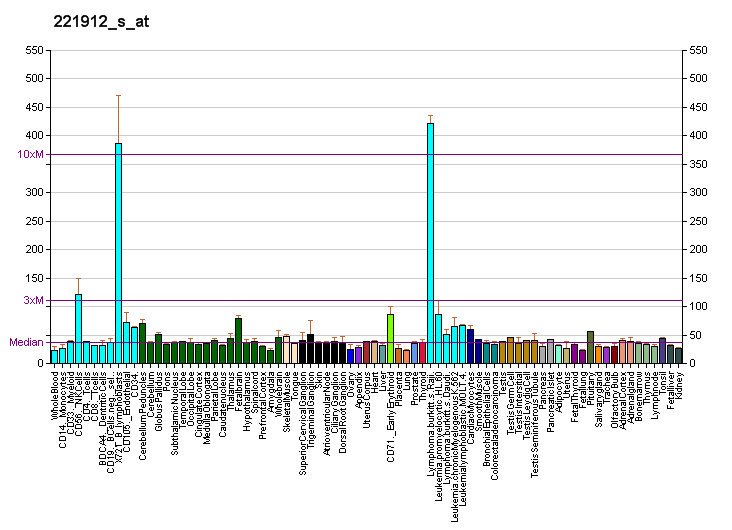
RNA expression pattern
Bgee	Human / Mouse (ortholog); Top expressed in: muscle of thigh; gastrocnemius muscle; triceps brachii muscle; right uterine tube; Skeletal muscle tissue of rectus abdominis; right testis; left testis; vastus lateralis muscle; anterior pituitary; apex of heart / Top expressed in: neural layer of retina; cerebellar cortex; lobe of cerebellum; cerebellar vermis; lip; neural tube; dentate gyrus of hippocampal formation granule cell; sternocleidomastoid muscle; temporal muscle; granulocyte; More reference expression data
BioGPS	More reference expression data
Gene ontology
Molecular function	protein binding
Cellular component	cytoplasm; centrosome; cytoskeleton; microtubule organizing center
Biological process	cell projection organization; cilium assembly
Sources:Amigo / QuickGO
Orthologs
Species	Human	Mouse
Entrez	79140	66264
Ensembl	ENSG00000160050	ENSMUSG00000028795
UniProt	Q9BUN5	Q8CEG5
RefSeq (mRNA)	NM_001301011; NM_024296	NM_025455
RefSeq (protein)	NP_001287940; NP_077272	NP_079731
Location (UCSC)	Chr 1: 32.2 – 32.21 Mb	Chr 4: 129.51 – 129.52 Mb
PubMed search
- Wikidata
View/Edit Human	View/Edit Mouse

Coiled-coil domain-containing protein 28B is a protein that in humans is encoded by the CCDC28B gene.

The product of this gene localizes to centrosomes and basal bodies. It interacts and colocalizes with several proteins associated with Bardet–Biedl syndrome (BBS).
