= MKS1 =

Protein-coding gene in the species Homo sapiens

Identifiers
- Aliases: MKS1, BBS13, MES, MKS, POC12, Meckel syndrome, type 1, JBTS28, MKS transition zone complex subunit 1
- External IDs: OMIM: 609883; MGI: 3584243; GeneCards: MKS1

Gene location (Human)
Chr.	Chromosome 17 (human)
Band	17q22	Start	58,205,441 bp
Band	17q22	End	58,219,605 bp

Gene location (Mouse)
Chr.	Chromosome 11 (mouse)
Band	11|11 C	Start	87,744,041 bp
Band	11|11 C	End	87,754,629 bp
RNA expression pattern
Bgee	Human / Mouse (ortholog); Top expressed in: right uterine tube; olfactory zone of nasal mucosa; left ovary; right ovary; ventricular zone; body of uterus; right adrenal gland; ganglionic eminence; sural nerve; right adrenal cortex / Top expressed in: neural layer of retina; otic vesicle; medullary collecting duct; renal corpuscle; tail of embryo; spermatocyte; ventricular zone; lens; parotid gland; lacrimal gland; More reference expression data
BioGPS	n/a
Gene ontology
Molecular function	protein binding
Cellular component	cytoplasm; ciliary basal body; cytosol; centrosome; cell projection; MKS complex; membrane; cilium; ciliary transition zone; microtubule organizing center; centriole; cytoskeleton
Biological process	epithelial structure maintenance; inner ear receptor cell stereocilium organization; regulation of Wnt signaling pathway, planar cell polarity pathway; regulation of canonical Wnt signaling pathway; motile cilium assembly; embryonic digit morphogenesis; head development; embryonic skeletal system development; regulation of smoothened signaling pathway involved in dorsal/ventral neural tube patterning; regulation of smoothened signaling pathway; common bile duct development; neural tube closure; determination of left/right symmetry; embryonic brain development; cell projection organization; branching morphogenesis of an epithelial tube; cilium assembly; ciliary basal body-plasma membrane docking; non-motile cilium assembly; smoothened signaling pathway involved in regulation of secondary heart field cardioblast proliferation; cardiac septum development; smoothened signaling pathway; cardiac septum morphogenesis
Sources:Amigo / QuickGO
Orthologs
Databases	NCBI: entry; OMA: entry
Species	Human	Mouse
Entrez	54903	380718
Ensembl	ENSG00000011143	ENSMUSG00000034121
UniProt	Q9NXB0	Q5SW45
RefSeq (mRNA)	NM_001165927; NM_017777; NM_001321268; NM_001321269; NM_001330397	NM_001039684
RefSeq (protein)	NP_001159399; NP_001308197; NP_001308198; NP_001317326; NP_060247	NP_001034773
Location (UCSC)	Chr 17: 58.21 – 58.22 Mb	Chr 11: 87.74 – 87.75 Mb
PubMed search
- Wikidata
View/Edit Human	View/Edit Mouse

Meckel syndrome, type 1 also known as MKS1 is a protein that in humans is encoded by the MKS1 gene.

== Function ==
The MKS1 protein along with meckelin are part of the flagellar apparatus basal body proteome and are required for cilium formation.

== Clinical significance ==
Mutations in the MKS1 are associated with Meckel syndrome or Bardet–Biedl syndrome.
