= Mackessack =

Mackessack or MacKessack may refer to:

== People ==
- Douglas Mackessack (1903–1987), Scottish cricketer, British Army officer, and whiskey distiller
- James Kessack (1879–1916), British trade unionist
- Kenneth Mackessack (1902–1982), Scottish cricketer and army officer

== Places ==
- Mackessack Park, Rothes, a football field in Moray, Scotland

== See also ==
- McKissic
- McKissack (disambiguation)
- McKissick (disambiguation)
