= BBS9 =

Gene of the species Homo sapiens

Identifiers
- Aliases: BBS9, B1, C18, D1, PTHB1, Bardet-Biedl syndrome 9
- External IDs: OMIM: 607968; MGI: 2442833; GeneCards: BBS9
Available structures
PDB	Ortholog search: PDBe RCSB
PDB	List of PDB id codes 4YD8

Gene location (Mouse)
Chr.	Chromosome 9 (mouse)
Band	9|9 A3	Start	22,387,011 bp
Band	9|9 A3	End	22,799,576 bp
Gene ontology
Molecular function	protein binding; molecular function
Cellular component	cytoplasm; cytosol; cell projection; BBSome; pericentriolar material; membrane; plasma membrane; cilium; centriolar satellite; ciliary transition zone; microtubule organizing center; ciliary membrane; cytoskeleton
Biological process	response to stimulus; cell projection organization; protein localization to cilium; protein transport; fat cell differentiation; visual perception; cilium assembly
Sources:Amigo / QuickGO
Orthologs
Databases	NCBI: entry; OMA: entry
Species	Human	Mouse
Entrez	27241	319845
Ensembl	ENSG00000122507	ENSMUSG00000035919
UniProt	Q3SYG4	Q811G0
RefSeq (mRNA)	NM_001033604; NM_001033605; NM_014451; NM_198428	NM_178415; NM_181316; NM_001360258; NM_001360259
RefSeq (protein)	NP_001028776; NP_001028777; NP_055266; NP_940820; NP_001334965 NP_001334966; NP_001334967; NP_001334968; NP_001334969; NP_001334970; NP_001334971; NP_001334972; NP_001334973; NP_001334974; NP_001334975; NP_001349608	NP_848502; NP_851833; NP_001347187; NP_001347188
Location (UCSC)	n/a	Chr 9: 22.39 – 22.8 Mb
PubMed search
- Wikidata
View/Edit Human	View/Edit Mouse

Bardet–Biedl syndrome 9 is a protein that in humans is encoded by the BBS9 gene.

The expression of the Bardet–Biedl syndrome 9 protein is downregulated by parathyroid hormone in osteoblastic cells, and therefore, is thought to be involved in parathyroid hormone action in bones.

Mutations in this gene are associated with the Bardet–Biedl syndrome.
