= TTC8 =

Protein-coding gene in the species Homo sapiens

Identifiers
- Aliases: TTC8, BBS8, RP51, tetratricopeptide repeat domain 8
- External IDs: OMIM: 608132; MGI: 1923510; GeneCards: TTC8

Gene location (Human)
Chr.	Chromosome 14 (human)
Band	14q31.3	Start	88,824,153 bp
Band	14q31.3	End	88,881,078 bp

Gene location (Mouse)
Chr.	Chromosome 12 (mouse)
Band	12|12 E	Start	98,886,833 bp
Band	12|12 E	End	98,949,497 bp
RNA expression pattern
Bgee	Human / Mouse (ortholog); Top expressed in: left ovary; islet of Langerhans; right adrenal cortex; right uterine tube; pituitary gland; right ovary; anterior pituitary; left adrenal gland; left adrenal cortex; stromal cell of endometrium / Top expressed in: neural layer of retina; olfactory epithelium; genital tubercle; median eminence; arcuate nucleus; pineal gland; tail of embryo; habenula; paraventricular nucleus of hypothalamus; dorsomedial hypothalamic nucleus; More reference expression data
BioGPS	n/a
Gene ontology
Molecular function	protein binding
Cellular component	cytoplasm; ciliary basal body; cytosol; centrosome; plasma membrane; cell projection; cilium; cytoskeleton; membrane; ciliary membrane; microtubule organizing center; BBSome; non-motile cilium; photoreceptor connecting cilium
Biological process	protein transport; establishment of anatomical structure orientation; sensory processing; cell projection organization; cilium assembly; non-motile cilium assembly; axon guidance; sensory perception of smell; olfactory bulb development; negative regulation of GTPase activity; camera-type eye photoreceptor cell differentiation; renal tubule development; fat cell differentiation; regulation of stress fiber assembly; multicellular organism growth; regulation of protein localization; establishment of planar polarity; inner ear receptor cell stereocilium organization; multi-ciliated epithelial cell differentiation; protein localization to plasma membrane
Sources:Amigo / QuickGO
Orthologs
Databases	NCBI: entry; OMA: entry
Species	Human	Mouse
Entrez	123016	76260
Ensembl	ENSG00000165533	ENSMUSG00000021013
UniProt	Q8TAM2	Q8VD72
RefSeq (mRNA)	NM_001288781; NM_001288782; NM_001288783; NM_144596; NM_198309 NM_198310; NM_001366535; NM_001366536	NM_029553; NM_198311; NM_001364378
RefSeq (protein)	NP_001275710; NP_001275711; NP_001275712; NP_653197; NP_938051 NP_938052; NP_001353464; NP_001353465; NP_001275710.1	NP_083829; NP_938053; NP_001351307
Location (UCSC)	Chr 14: 88.82 – 88.88 Mb	Chr 12: 98.89 – 98.95 Mb
PubMed search
- Wikidata
View/Edit Human	View/Edit Mouse

Tetratricopeptide repeat domain 8 (TTC8) also known as Bardet–Biedl syndrome 8 is a protein that in humans is encoded by the TTC8 gene.

== Function ==
TTC8 is associated with gamma-tubulin, BBS4, and PCM1 in the centrosome. PCM1 in turn is involved in centriolar replication during ciliogenesis.

TTC8 is located in the cilia of spermatids, retina, and bronchial epithelium cells.

== Clinical significance ==
Mutations in the TTC8 gene is one of 14 genes identified as causal for Bardet–Biedl syndrome.
