= BBSome =

Protein complex involved in cilium biogenesis

A BBSome is a protein complex that operates in primary cilia biogenesis, homeostasis, and intraflagellar transport (IFT). The BBSome recognizes cargo proteins and signaling molecules like G-protein coupled receptors (GPCRs) on the ciliary membrane and helps transport them to and from the primary cilia. Primary cilia are nonmotile microtubule projections that function like antennae and are found in many types of cells. They receive various environmental signals to aid the cell in survival. They can detect photons by concentrating rhodopsin, a light receptor that converts photons into chemical signals, or odorants by concentrating olfactory receptors on the primary cilia surface. Primary cilia are also meaningful in cell development and signaling. They do not contain any way to make proteins within the primary cilia, so the BBSome aids in transporting essential proteins to, from, and within the cilia. Examples of cargo proteins that the BBSome is responsible for ferrying include smoothened (a component of the Hedgehog signaling pathway), polycystic-1 (PC1), and several G-Protein coupled receptors (GPCRs) like somatostatin receptors (Sstr3), melanin-concentrating hormone receptor 1 (Mchr1), and neuropeptide Y2 receptor.

The BBSome is an eight-protein complex consisting of different subunits named Bardet-Biedl Syndrome (BBS) proteins after the ciliopathy disease caused by a mutation in BBS proteins. Currently, there are 24 discovered BBS gene products that either form the BBSome or interact with the BBSome. Several BBS proteins that are not associated with the BBSome (BBS11, BBS13, BBS15, BBS16, BBS19-24) have yet to be extensively studied. The proteins within the largest and most stable BBSome core complex are BBS1, BBS4, BBS5, BBS8, BBS9, and BBS-interacting protein BBIP1, also known as BBS18. BBIP1 is the proposed eighteenth BBS gene due to its essential role in interacting with the BBSome and reduced levels in patients with a BBS diagnosis. BBS2 and BBS7 are also within the BBSome but are more loosely associated, which leads to their exclusion in the core complex. Other BBSome-associated proteins can be found in higher-level organisms with more IFT requirements. For example, BBS6, BBS10, and BB12 form into chaperonin complexes with CCT/TRiC (chaperonin-containing tailless complex polypeptide 1/tailless complex polypeptide 1 ring complex) in chordates which function to regulate and oversee the assembly of the BBSome in an ATP-dependent manner. BBS3 associates with Arl6 (ARF-like 6) and helps in recruiting the BBSome to ciliary membranes. BBS7 interacts with LZTFL1 (Leucine Zipper Transaction Factor-Like 1) to regulate the entry of the BBSome into the primary cilia. The BBSome has a similar structure and function compared to COPI, COPII, and clathrin coats showing its similarity to the function of these vesicle-forming complexes in transporting proteins. All BBS proteins are highly conserved in genetics which shows their importance in primary cilium biogenesis and intraflagellar transport (IFT).

The BBSome links cargo proteins to intraflagellar transport (IFT) machinery, which transports structural components and receptors, with the help of motor proteins dynein and kinesin, from the tip to the base of the primary cilia (anterograde transport) and back (retrograde transport) along ciliary microtubules. Since cilia cannot synthesize proteins, the IFT pathway is required for biogenesis, maintenance, and signaling within the cilia through motors, IFT-A and IFT-B subcomplexes, and the cargo proteins. The BBSome assists with the assembly and stabilization of the IFT complex at the ciliary base and mediates the bidirectional movement, all of which sustains the success of IFT. IFT-A controls retrograde IFT, and IFT-B controls anterograde transport. DYF-2 is a protein that functions with BBS1 to stabilize the interaction between the BBSome and the IFT complex in preparation for retrograde transport. In mutants with nonfunctional BBSome proteins, IFT-B can not associate with IFT-A, which demonstrates the BBSome function of assembling the IFT machinery. An experiment performed with Caenorhabditis elegans looked at GFP-tagged IFT-B protein complexes to look for IFT-B accumulation at the tip of the primary cilia in organisms with inhibited IFT turnaround. The defective (Dyf) C. elegans mutants showed a dissociation between the BBSome and IFT particles causing BBS proteins to accumulate at the ciliary base, regular anterograde transport, but an accumulation of IFT-B components at the ciliary tip due to an absence of the BBSome.

BBS gene expression has been observed in nonciliated cells in cardiac, vascular, and renal tissues, which expands the parameters of the BBSome functions to cellular processes other than solely primary cilia protein transport, such as plasma membrane receptor localization, gene expression, and cell division. The discovery that BBS7, and other BBS proteins, like BBS4, enter the nucleus and, in the case of BBS7, interact with ring finger protein 2 (RNF2) to regulate its transcription supports the concept that the BBSome might also be involved in gene expression. It is not yet definitive on whether this gene expression role is separate from the BBSome transportation of proteins function.

== Discovery ==
It was discovered by Maxence Nachury, Alexander Loktev, and several other associates in a study performed in 2007 that used biochemical purification of complexes that contained BBS4 in mammalian cells. The researchers identified BBSome localization to both centriolar satellites in the cytoplasm and the membrane of the cilia, the importance of the BBSome concerning IFT, and the mechanism for delivery to the cilia via centriolar satellites. They hypothesized that the BBSome was transported to the basal body by centriolar satellites, which are cytoplasmic granules that bring specific proteins to the centrosome due to its connection to PCM-1. They proposed the use of centriolar satellites to transport the BBSome was to function in a chaperone-like manner to limit BBSome activity to the basal body. The researchers noticed that BBS4 interacts with PCM-1, a core component of centriolar satellites, and helps bring proteins to the centrosome. Then, the BBSome can dissociate from PMC-1 and perform its function in the basal body or within the primary cilia. The researchers believed the complex consisted of seven proteins (BBS1, BBS2, BBS4, BSS5, BBS7, BBS8, and BBS9). They also discovered the relationship between the subunits of interactions of BBS1/BBS2/BBS7 with β-propeller domains, BBS4/BBS8 with TPR (tetratricopeptide repeat) regions, BBS3/Arl6, and BBS6/BBS10/BBS12 relations for chaperonin-like functions. They noticed that BBS9 interacted with several other subunits like BBS1, BBS2, BBS4, BBS5, and BBS8, so they proposed that it was located in the center of the complex. They also noticed how the BBSome function was linked to Rabin8, a protein that localizes the basal body and attracts the BBSome protein BBS1. The scientists then looked at BBS5 to determine the areas of the BBSome that function in lipid binding and noticed how the binding of phosphoinositides might be essential for ciliogenesis. Arl6's crystal structure allowed for high-resolution structural information on the BBSome subunits to be collected when the BBSome is active (Arl6 bound). High-resolution cryo-electron microscopy with an average of 3.8 Å was used to display the overall complex structure, but it did not allow for an accurate atomic model due to limited resolution. Only approximately 80% of the complex could be described using an atomic model. Due to the relatively recent discovery of the protein complex, there is still a lot about the mechanism in which it functions that remain unknown. The identity of which cilia membrane proteins require the BBSome, the molecular and/or enzymatic activity of the complex, the specific function of BBS proteins that are not within the BBSome, as well as many other questions still need to be answered for the complete understanding of what the BBSome is and how it functions.

== Structure and organization ==
=== Assembly ===
It is believed that the BBSome assembles sequentially, beginning with the association of BBS7, BBS chaperonins, and the CCT/TRiC complex, which functions as a scaffold to which further subunits can bind. BBS2 and BBS7 bind together first. BBS2 and BBS7 are missing in certain species, such as Drosophila, which leads to the idea that they might be more important in organizing the BBSome in higher organisms rather than directly related to the cargo and membrane binding functions of the BBSome. Then, BBS9 is added to the core complex followed by BBS5 and BBS8.

=== Core structure ===
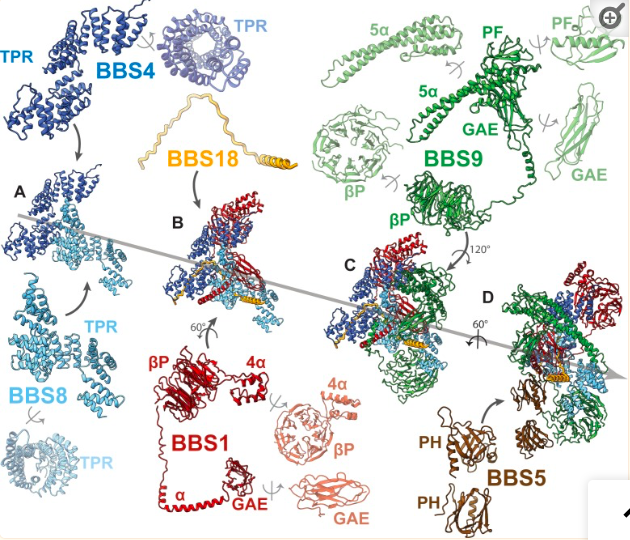
(A–E) The described order of addition of subunits has been chosen for visual clarity and does not reflect the sequential assembly in vivo. BBS4 and BBS8 are shown in two different views to visualize the superhelical arrangement of the TPR repeats. Likewise, domains of BBS1 and BBS9 are also shown individually in two views.

BBIP1, also known as BBS18, is the smallest subunit that is located in the center of the complex. This protein domain winds through two super-helically arranged (TPR) domains of the BBS4 and BBS8 subunits, which are arranged perpendicularly and stabilized by ionic interactions. Together, the BBS18 domain clamps the other two subunits in a Y-shaped layout that serves as the backbone for the BBSome complex. It is critical for the stability and assembly of the BBSome, particularly with stabilizing the interactions between BBS4 and BBS8. BBS8 has a loop in its domain that is different across purified BBSomes which leads to the idea that this domain might be involved in tissue specific activity of the BBSome. The C-terminal helix of BBS18 also loosely interacts with the gamma-adaptin ear (GAE) domain of BBS1, the most relevant domain to cargo recognition, to also aid with structure of the complex. BBS1 then binds its N-terminal β-propeller domain to the N-terminal of the BBS4 TPR superhelix, a connection which is stabilized by hydrophobic interactions. It wraps around the BBS4 and BBS8 domains and binds its C-terminal GAE domain to the TPR domain of BBS8. BBS9 associates in a similar but reciprocal manner with its N-terminal β-propeller domain bound to the N-terminus of the TPR superhelix of BBS8. BBS9 then wraps around BBS4 and parts of BBS1 and binds its C-terminal GAE to the GAE domain of BBS1. BBS9 also interacts with BBS1 to create an open area within the core complex to allow for the wrapping of BBS1 around the BBS4 and BBS8 subunits. Their C-terminal domains interact with one another so the β-propeller domains are facing the outside of the complex to interact with the TPR domains of BBS4 and BBS8. Certain pathogenic mutations like Q439H, Q445K, or L518P can disrupt the interaction between the BBS8, BBS9, and BBS1 domains causing an improper association of the subunits and a nonfunctional BBSome. The necessity of having a properly assembled BBSome highlights the importance of the interactions between the subunits to the function of the protein complex.

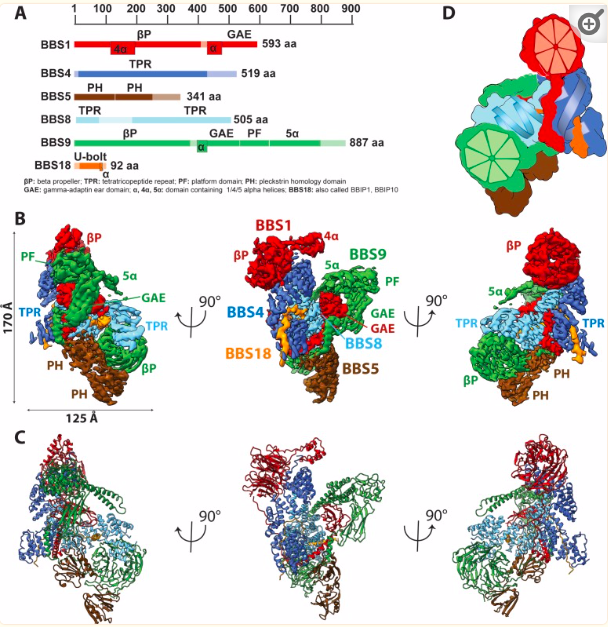
(A) Domain architecture of the protomers forming the BBSome core complex. The parts of the primary structure that could be assigned in the density is shown in full colors, while non-modeled regions are represented in opaque colors. (B) Composite cryo-EM density map of the BBSome core complex in different orientations. Each protomer is colored differently and the thresholds of the segmented densities of the individual domains were adjusted to visualize each domain at an optimal signal intensity. BBS5 is poorly visible at the signal level of the other subunits and required a reconstruction from a subset of particles, which was obtained by 3D-sorting (Figure 1—figure supplement 1). (C) The final model of the core BBSome. (D): Schematic representation of the complex, highlighting the two β-propeller domains of BBS1 and BBS9 as red and green segmented wheels, and the super helical arrangements of the TPR repeats of BBS4 and BBS8 as blue and cyan helices.

BBS5 has two pleckstrin homology (PH) domains that can bind to phosphoinositides, mainly phosphatidylinositol 3-phosphate (PI3P) and phosphatidic acid (PA), which are thought to be essential for cilia biogenesis. These PH regions can also interact with the β-propeller of BBS9. BBS5 is seen to be more loosely associated with the core complex, which led to the suggestion that it most likely assists with the BBSome making contact with membranes through the bound phosphoinositides to regulate the BBSome transportation in the cilium. BBS5 on one side of the complex allows for binding to the ciliary membrane, while the Arl6 binding side on the opposite site of the complex can bind cargo. The discovery that BBS5 is missing in particular natively purified BBSomes reveals that it may not be the only BBS subunit that can bind to phosphoinositides and PAs. The lack of the presence of BBS2, BBS7, and BBS5 in all of the isolated BBSomes shows that these subunits are most likely not required for all stages of the functionality of the BBSome.

=== Associated proteins ===
==== BBS3 ====
BBS3 collaborates with Arl6 to control the BBSome recruitment to the membrane and the entry and exit to and from the cilia. When BBS3 is bound to GTP, it can bind to the N-terminal β-propeller of BBS1. BBS17 can also help promote BBS3 to the basal body, which in turn controls the amount of BBSome available for anterograde IFT into the cilia.

==== Arl6 ====
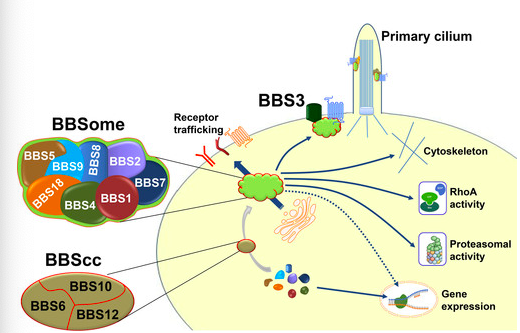
The assembly of the 8 units of the BBSome is mediated by the BBScc (Bardet-Biedl syndrome [BBS] chaperonins complex) that contains BBS6, BBS10, and BBS12. A major role of the BBSome relates to the trafficking of cargos to and from cilia including G protein–coupled receptors through a process that involves BBS3. The BBSome has also emerged as a critical mechanism for the cell membrane localization of various receptors including the leptin receptor, insulin receptor, and G protein–coupled receptors in a manner independent of its ciliary function. In addition, the BBSome has been implicated in the regulation of several other cellular processes including cytoskeleton dynamic, RhoA (rat sarcoma virus homolog family member A) activity, proteasomal activity, and gene expression. The dashed line indicates a potential, but not proven, function of the BBSome.

Arl6 is an ARF(ADP Ribosylation Factor)-like GTPase that helps recruit the BBSome to the ciliary membranes. It is comparable to Arf1 and Sar1 in COPI/COPII and clathrin coats. The BBSome complex begins with a conformation that has BBS2 and BBS7 interacting at the C-terminal hairpin in BBS9 and the β-propeller of BBS1 to form a lobe at the top of the complex to block the Arl6 binding site on the BBS1 subunit. This is the formation of the BBSome complex when it is not needed for IFT regulation. When the BBSome is needed, the BBS2 and BBS7 dome moves to allow for binding the membrane-associated GTPase Arl6 and the activation of the BBSome. Arl6 recruits the BBSome to the membrane and binds to the peripheral N-terminal β-propeller domain of BBS1, which functions in ciliary cargo protein recognition but is not directly involved in cargo loading. This change in shape allows the region of the BBSome that is prominently positive to be near the membrane, which helps with the association of the complex to the negatively charged ciliary membrane. The conformation also allows for a primarily negative area, that all BBSome units other than BBS5 contribute, to be exposed in the center of the complex. The three main negatively charged areas are located where the GAE domain of BBS1 contacts the 5α domain of BBS9, deep in the BBSome core where there is an α-helix in the BBS18 domain, and where there is a higher concentration of glutamate and aspartate residues in the α-helix of the BBS1 β-propeller. The complexity of the BBSome structure, especially in the binding recognition site, shows the specificity of the binding relationships and activities of the complex. This created area facilitates the binding of the cargo proteins with their positively charged signaling sequences. These positively charged domains, made of aromatic and basic residues, are mainly located in the third intracellular loop and the C-terminal domain of ciliary GPCRs. The position of the positively charged sequences end up close to BBS1, which is also essential in cargo protein recognition.

==== Rabin8/Rab8 ====
Rabin8 is a guanine nucleotide exchange factor for Rab8 necessary for ciliogenesis in primary cilia. Rab family GTPases usually assist in vesicular trafficking by promoting the docking and binding of vesicles to their target. Rabin8 helps localize the basal body and promote ciliogenesis and Rab8 association with vesicles coming from the Golgi Body to help with target complex combination by facilitating the binding of GTP to Rab8. The BBSome, specifically the interaction between the BBS1 subunit and the C-terminus of Rabin8, is thought to aid with the GEF activity of Rabin8 to direct vesicles leaving the Golgi Body to the base of the cilia. Rab8 bound to a GTP molecule will enter the cilia and drive ciliary membrane expansion. Blocking the production of Rab8-GTP can result in BBS symptoms occurring in organisms such as zebrafish.

== Medical applications ==
BBSome activity has recently been expanded to systems other than primary cilia transports and has been connected to renal, neuronal, vascular, and cardiac development, regulation, and function. The expression of BBS genes were seen in different tissues that relate to blood pressure, cardiovascular function, and renal activity. Mutations in the BBS genes will also result in Bardet-Biedl Syndrome. Ciliary BBSomes can affect obesity levels, ciliary BBSomes in nephronal tissue can affect kidney health, neuronal BBSomes can play an important role in regulating blood pressure, and BBSomes in vascular and cardiac cells can also affect arterial pressure and heart development. All of these effects are seen in patients with BBS, but BBS gene polymorphism can be associated with complications in blood pressure, body weight, and other cardiovascular factors in patients that do not have BBS.

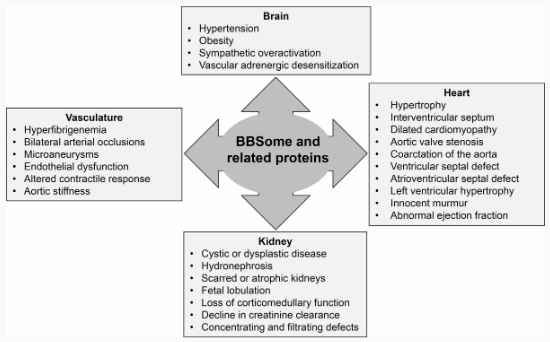
Depiction of the cardiovascular effects evoked by deficiency in the BBSome and related proteins in keys organs (brain, kidney, heart, and vasculature) involved in the control of various cardiovascular parameters.

=== Bardet-Biedl Syndrome ===
Bardet-Biedl Syndrome is an autosomal recessive disorder that occurs in about 1 in every 100,000 live births and is due to homozygous mutations in any of the BBS genes other than BBIP1. These mutations often lead to the incorrect formation of the BBSome which then has subsequent effects on cargo trafficking and IFT regulation. The results of this mutation can range from blindness to deafness to a lack of smell. The visual impairment can include difficulties in light perception, dense cataracts, or retinal dystrophy. Symptoms can also include obesity, which is potentially related to the increase in LDL cholesterol, decrease in HDL levels, and increase C peptide concentrations that have been observed in BBS patients. The primary cilia are required for the Hedgehog signaling pathway. This pathway plays a vital role during vertebrate embryonic development and directly affects the development of limbs and digits. The nonfunctional BBSome that results from the mutations in any of the seven BBS proteins inhibits the hedgehog pathway leading to post-axial polydactyly (meaning the extra digit occurs on the outside of the hand or foot) or brachydactyly where the digits are shorter than normal. More potential symptoms include kidney failure, retinitis pigmentosa, behavioral dysfunction, and hypogonadism. Mutations in one of 19 known BBS genes is present in 80% of patients that have been diagnosed with BBS, with a single missense mutation in the M390R location in the BBS1 gene representing about an 80% of the mutations in this gene. The remaining 20% have been diagnosed with the disease, but still require molecular diagnosis to determine the source of mutation causing the disease. One research study performed whole genome sequencing on 450 families with a history of BBS. Exons of their DNA samples were acquired, underwent high throughput sequencing, were aligned with the human reference genome, and single nucleotide polymorphism calling was performed. Approximately 15% of the subjects did not have any mutations in the BBS genes, but the remaining percentage of the subjects contained nonsense, frame-shift, splice, missense, and in-frame deletion mutations. The primary mutation that led to a nonfunctional BBSome was a nonsense mutation in the BBIP1 gene dubbed p. Leu 58* which encodes for the eighth subunit in the BBSome. Bardet-Biedl Syndrome has also been related to hypertension and other cardiovascular complications.

=== Obesity ===
BBSome dysfunction has been shown to cause obesity in mouse models as well as humans with BBS. Leptin is a hormone that is released from adipose tissue to monitor feeding behavior. The BBSome, specifically BBS1, was shown to interact with the C-terminal cytoplasmic receptors of leptin receptors (LebRb) to transport them to the plasma membrane. A mutation named M390R, which is the most commonly seen BBS1 mutation observed in BBS patients, significantly decreased the potential for BBS1 to interact with LepRb. This reduced the amount of LepRb surface expression which affects appetite, food intake, and energy output. BBS10 was also seen to promote the stability of LepRb by increasing its translation of decreasing its degradation. BBS17 was found to function in the regulation of LebRb activating Stat3 transcription factor in relation to leptin sensitivity. This system of leptin expression and regulation is a BBSome pathway that is independent of cilia, showing the diverse and greatly unknown applications for the complex. A study performed with mice that had a nonfunctional BBSome were found to be incapable of transducing leptin signals in certain hypothalamic neurons. The mice used in this experiment gained weight over the course of the study due to the lack of leptin receptors that could be transported to the cilia for environment signaling. The BBSome also traffics the insulin receptor, so insufficient BBSome function reduces the insulin receptor expression which translates into reduced signaling. This leads to deficiencies in glucose metabolism, insulin resistance, and the proliferation of diabetes in BBS patients.

=== Kidney function ===
Primary cilia have been observed on most of the cells in the nephron and on the apical surface of epithelial cells in the lumen of the kidney which leads to the connection of BBSome function with renal activity. All BBS protein mutations, except BBS2, will result in renal dysfunction with more severe renal diseases coming from mutations in the BBS chaperonin genes. Approximately 82% of people diagnosed with BBS have shown symptoms of some form of kidney defectiveness. The cilia on the endothelial cells survey the blood flow to the kidney. Any dysfunction in the BBSome can lead to a shorter primary cilia and a reduction in epithelial turnover and repair leading to different cystic kidney diseases, decrease in the ability to process creatine out of the body, and the inability to filter waste products that are often paired with hypertension development. The renal anomalies that can arise due to BBS deficiencies can cause serious medical problems that may lead to dialysis or kidney transplantation. A study with knockout Bbs4 gene in mice resulted in decreased urine production and increased sodium and blood urea nitrogen concentrations leading to the development of glomerular cysts.

=== Cardiovascular relations ===
The BBSome has also been connected to cardiac development and maintenance, with particular function in the renin-angiotensin system, due to its high prevalence in people with BBS. Different defects that have been explored in connection with the BBSome are dilated cardiomyopathy, aortic valve stenosis, and hypertrophy of the interventricular septum. The BBSome has also been related to left-right patterning and the correct cardiac looping with defects in the BBSome function leading to situs inversus and randomized cardiac looping. Looking at the involvement of BBS6 in overseeing the SWI/SNF chromatin remodeling complex has provided signs that this BBS protein, and potentially others, could lead to heart disease in patients without BBS. BBSome presence in vascular smooth muscle has been shown to affect vascular reactivity and plays a significant role in the regulation of blood pressure. A person with BBS is about eight times more likely to develop hypertension compared to people without a BBS gene mutation with mutations in the BBS10 encoding gene have more dramatic increases in blood pressure. In fact, mutations in all of the BBS proteins, except BBS2, will lead to some level of hypertension. Hypertension is also seen in heterozygous BBS carriers which consists of about 1% of the population. Studies involving mice with BBS gene deletions have shown that mutations or defects in the BBSome activity can lead to cardiovascular issues like hypertension. Elevated blood pressure has been seen in mice with BBS3, BBS4, and BBS6 deletions, but was absent in mice with BBS2 deletions. These mice were also shown to have an increase in renal sympathetic nerve activity, linking the sympathetic nervous system to hypertension with BBSome dysfunction as the common link. A study was performed using a mouse model to analyze the effects of BBSome activity dysfunction in smooth muscle cells through the deletion of the Bbs1 gene on vascular function, blood pressure, and arterial stiffening. The results showed heightened contractility of the vascular rings and an increase in arterial stiffness.due to enhanced endothelin-1-induced contractility of mesenteric arteries. The aortic rings of mice with Bbs1 mutations had a decrease in vasorelaxation responses when exposed to acetylcholine leading to an increase in aortic pulse wave velocity. The deletion increased the vascular angiotensinogen gene expression in the aorta which activated the renin-angiotensin system and led to aorta stiffening. The high prevalence of cardiac disease in leading causes of death presents a very real need to further understand the relationship between BBSome function and cardiac health.

BBSomes that are found in neurons can have a wide range of effects on a person's health. One particularly studied avenue is the effect of neuronal BBSomes on blood pressure regulation. This study looked at mice with a Bbs1 deletion in regular neurons and neurons that specifically released the long signaling form of LRb (Leptin Receptor). The researchers noticed a sympathetic increase in blood pressure without an increase in heart rate and a higher renal sympathetic nerve activity (SNA) in the mice with the Bbs1 deletion in regular neurons and LRb neurons compared to the control mice. The higher SNA and increased body weight due to the deletion of BBS genes all contributed to the development of hypertension in the mice. Hypertension is a symptom that is often seen with and is the leading cause of death in BBS patients, so the understanding of how it develops is critical. The researchers discovered that a deletion of the IFT88 gene, which is a key protein for the IFT-B complex, also showed an increased body weight but had no effect on the blood pressure or sympathetic nerve reaction showing that the BBSome involvement in cilia formation is not what is causing the observed symptoms.

=== More mutations ===
The structure and composition of BBSomes vary across species and different types of cells, which leads to different mutations having a variety of effects in certain cells. Mutations in the BBS1 and BBS10 genes are seen in about 70% of cases of patients of European descent. Even people without the BBSome dysfunction causing ciliopathy Bardert-Biedl Syndrome have been found to have certain symptoms of the disease such as obesity or hypertension due to variance or small mutations in some of the BBS genes. One particular mutation that has been studied is the p. Leu 58* mutation in the expression of BBIP1 gene products. This mutation eliminates the helix that ties BBS18 to BBS1. It has been shown that this leads to dysfunction in the assembly of the BBSome which can have detrimental effects on systems outside of ciliary transport. Mutations in the BBS17/LZTFL1 or BBS3/Arl6 genes have shown to have a detrimental effect on trafficking proteins to the cilia without having an effect on the assembly of the BBSome. Zebrafish have been used to study BBS function and mutations. A study on the importance between Rab8-GTP production to BBS was performed when scientists injected mRNAs coding for Rab8 mutations into one-cell zebrafish embryos. These mutations end in abnormalities in Kupffer's vesicle which is analogous to the node in humans and contributes to the inversion of organ laterality. The nonfunctional BBSome leads to defects in the primary cilia that covers Kupffer's vesicle, a complex that is responsible for instituting left and right asymmetry of the brain, heart, and gut in zebrafish during embryonic development. The lack of BBSome functionality also caused delays in dynein-dependent retrograde transport of melanosomes, organelles that synthesize and contain melanin. A study on C. elegans with a whole-genome mutagenesis screen identified two mutations in dyf-2 and bbs-1 which showed normal anterograde IFT but defective IFT turnaround at the tip prevents retrograde transport. One experiment showed that inhibiting the production of BBS5 lead to the absence of flagella in Chlamydomonas. When bbs4 mutants of Chlamydomonas were analyzed, researchers found that the cells showed normal flagellar structure, but had defective IFT transport.
