= McKissic =

McKissic is a surname. Notable people with the surname include:

- Dwight McKissic (born 1958), American Southern Baptist minister
- J. D. McKissic (born 1993), American football player
- Shaquielle McKissic (born 1990), American-Azerbaijani basketball player
- William Dwight McKissic, Sr. (b. 1958), Southern Baptist minister in Arlington, Texas

== See also ==
- McKissack (disambiguation)
- McKissick (disambiguation)
- MacKessack (disambiguation)
