= McKissick =

McKissick is a name and may refer to:

== People ==
=== Surname ===
- Floyd Bixler McKissick (1922–1991), American civil rights advocate and author
- Floyd Bixler McKissick, Jr. (born 1952), American lawyer and North Carolina State Senator
- Jaycen McKissick, punk rock musician with The Action Design and Pipedown
- Joe McKissack, one-time owner (1993–1999) of WEZZ radio in Monroeville, Alabama
- John McKissick (1926–2019), American high school football coach from South Carolina
- Norsalus McKissick (1923–1997), American gospel singer with The Roberta Martin Singers

=== Middle name ===
- Thomas McKissick Jones (1816–1892), American politician in Tennessee
- Helen MacKissick Williamson (approx. 1904–1957), American headmistress in 1953 at Rosemary Hall prep school, Greenwich, Connecticut

== Places ==
- McKissick Museum, University of South Carolina

== See also ==
- McKissic
- McKissack (disambiguation)
- MacKessack (disambiguation)
