= Victor A. McKusick =

American geneticist (1921–2008)

Victor Almon McKusick
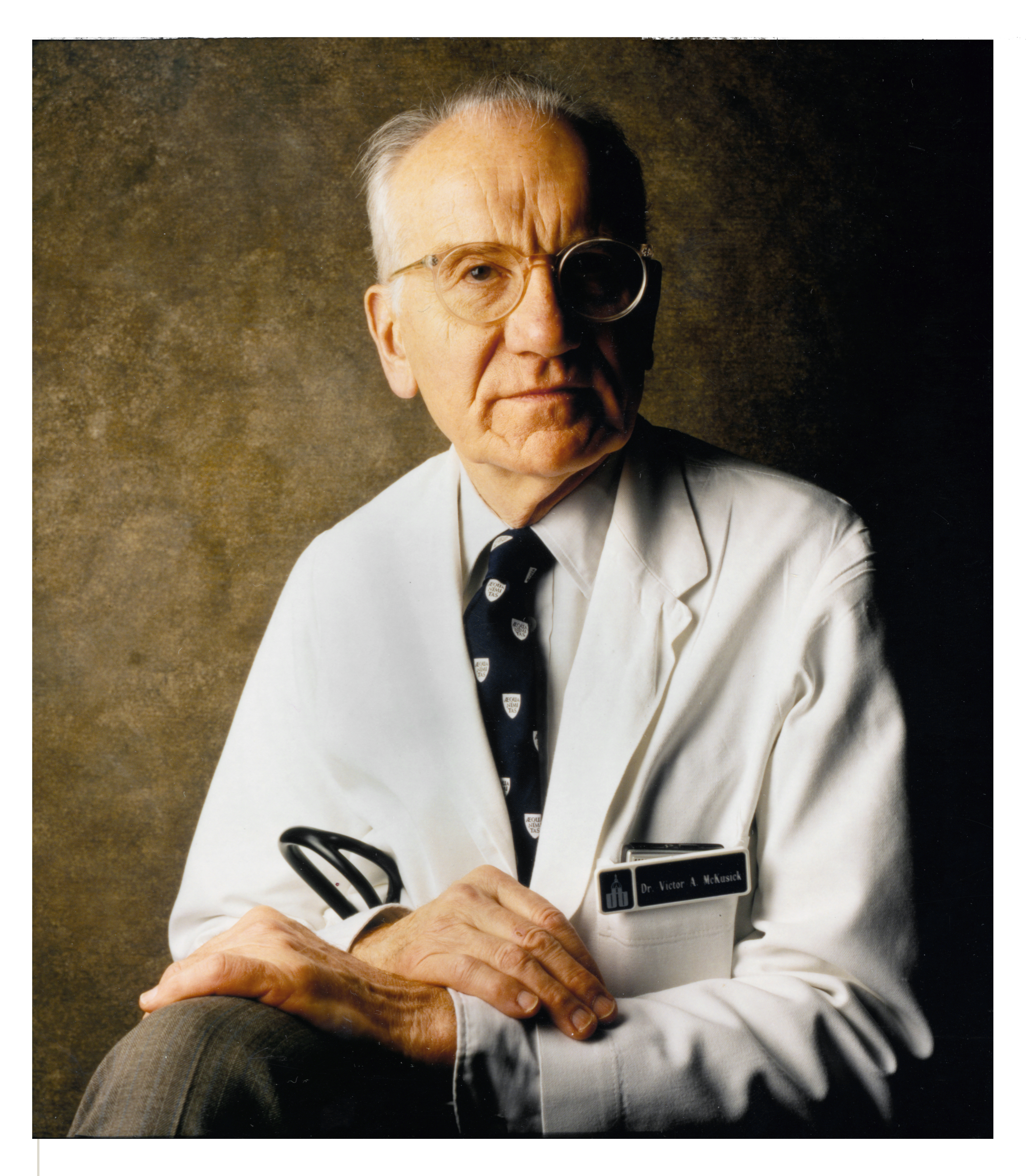
- Victor McKusick
- Born: October 21, 1921; Parkman, Maine, U.S.
- Died: July 22, 2008 (aged 86); Towson, Maryland, U.S.
- Education: Tufts University; Johns Hopkins University
- Known for: Mendelian Inheritance in Man, OMIM and McKusick–Kaufman syndrome
- Awards: William Allan Award (1977); Lasker Award (1997); Japan Prize (2008)

Victor Almon McKusick (October 21, 1921 – July 22, 2008) was an American internist and medical geneticist, and Professor of Medicine at the Johns Hopkins Hospital, Baltimore. He was a proponent of the mapping of the human genome due to its utility for studying congenital diseases. He is well known for his studies of the Amish. He was the original author and, until his death, remained chief editor of Mendelian Inheritance in Man (MIM) and its online counterpart Online Mendelian Inheritance in Man (OMIM). He is widely known as the "father of medical genetics".

== Personal life ==
Victor McKusick and his identical twin Vincent L. McKusick were born on October 21, 1921. Victor was one of five children. His father was a graduate of Bates College. Before deciding to work as a dairy farmer, Victor's father served as a high school principal in Chester, Vermont. Victor's mother had been an elementary school teacher before marrying. Victor and his siblings were raised on a dairy farm in Parkman, Maine.

During the summer of 1937, Victor suffered a severe microaerophilic Streptococcus infection in his axilla. As a result, Victor spent time in two hospitals, one of which was Massachusetts General Hospital. He finally saw a successful diagnosis and course of treatment, using sulfanilamide during his ten weeks at Massachusetts General. Since none of his close family were doctors, the events of 1937 represented McKusick's first substantial experience with the medical community. He stated, "Perhaps I would have ended up a lawyer if it weren't for the microaerophilic streptococcus."

Victor married Anne Bishop McKusick in 1949. Anne served Johns Hopkins Hospital as associate professor of medicine in the Division of Rheumatology. The couple had two sons, Victor and Kenneth, and a daughter, Carol.

== Medical career ==
=== Education ===
After high school, Victor chose to study at Tufts University, and studied there for six semesters from the fall of 1940 to the summer of 1942. Although Tufts had an associated medical school, Victor was fascinated by Johns Hopkins and by its dedication to medical research, and chose to attend Hopkins Medical School instead.

During World War II The Johns Hopkins University School of Medicine could not fill its classes. Therefore, for the first time since the school's founding in 1893, the school temporarily discontinued requiring a baccalaureate degree for admission. Victor applied during his sixth semester at Tufts, and began in the fall of 1942, as one of the first, of very few, who ever entered the school without a bachelor's degree. Victor never earned a baccalaureate degree, although he has been awarded over 20 honorary degrees. He earned his Doctor of Medicine through an accelerated program in only three years. He was offered the prestigious William Osler Internship in Internal Medicine at Johns Hopkins Hospital, and chose to remain at Hopkins for his residency. He completed his residency training as a cardiologist, since the department of genetics did not exist at the time. McKusick specialized in heart murmurs, and utilized spectroscopy to analyze heart sounds.

=== Work at Hopkins ===
In 1956 McKusick traveled to Copenhagen to speak about the heritable disorders of connective tissue at the first international congress of human genetics. The meeting looms as the birthplace of the medical genetics field. In the following decades, McKusick went on to head the Chronic Disease Clinic and created and chaired a new Division of Medical Genetics at Hopkins beginning in 1957. In 1973, he served as Physician-in-Chief, William Osler Professor of Medicine, and Chairman of the Department of Medicine at Johns Hopkins Hospital and School of Medicine. McKusick resigned the appointments in 1985, but continued to teach, conduct research, and practice medicine in the Departments of Medicine and Medical Genetics. He held concurrent appointments as University Professor of Medical Genetics at the McKusick–Nathans Institute of Genetic Medicine, Professor of Medicine at the Johns Hopkins School of Medicine, Professor of Epidemiology at the Johns Hopkins Bloomberg School of Public Health, and Professor of Biology at Johns Hopkins University. McKusick played a role in the development of the HeLa cell line that has been instrumental in biomedical research, although he did not reveal to the Lacks family all the details about subsequent blood draws which were for genotyping HeLa. He held numerous faculty appointments while remaining at Johns Hopkins until his death in 2008.

=== Organizations ===
In 1960, McKusick founded and co-directed the Annual Short Course in Medical and Experimental Mammalian Genetics at the Jackson Laboratory in Bar Harbor, Maine. He published Mendelian Inheritance in Man (MIM), which was the first published catalog of all known genes and genetic disorders, in 1966. The complete text of MIM was made available online free of charge beginning in 1987, and titled Online Mendelian Inheritance in Man (OMIM). The 12th and final print edition was published in 1998. The online database is continually updated, and linked with the National Center for Biotechnology Information. OMIM is distributed through the National Library of Medicine, and has been a part of the Entrez database network system since 1995. At the time of McKusick's death, OMIM contained 18,847 entries. He also led the Annual Course in Medical Genetics at the University of Bologna Residential Center in Bertinoro di Romagna, Italy in 1987. McKusick was founding president of the Human Genome Organization in 1989.

=== Publications and research ===
McKusick wrote extensively on the history of medicine, genetics, medical genetics, and about Parkman, Maine. He co-founded Genomics in 1987 with Frank Ruddle, and served as an editor. He led a Congressionally-chartered committee examining the ethics of testing Abraham Lincoln's tissue for the presence of Marfan syndrome genes.

His well-known published articles include:

- Probable Assignment of the Duffy Blood Group Locus to Chromosome 1 in Man (1968)
- The Anatomy of the Human Genome: a Neo-Vesalian Basis for Medicine in the 21st Century (2001)
- "On lumpers and splitters, or the nosology of genetic disease."

In a 2005 paper presented by M.I. Poling, McKusick said:

I have always told my students, residents, and fellows, if you want to really get on top of some topic, you need to know how it got from where it was to how it is now. I was always strong on eponyms, too—like Marfan syndrome, Freeman–Sheldon syndrome, Down syndrome, Tay–Sachs disease, etc. On rounds, the resident or student would present a patient with some particular condition, and I would always ask, so who is so and so for whom the disease was named. This prompts thought and research into the disease or condition itself to find out who first described it and, therefore, for whom it was named.

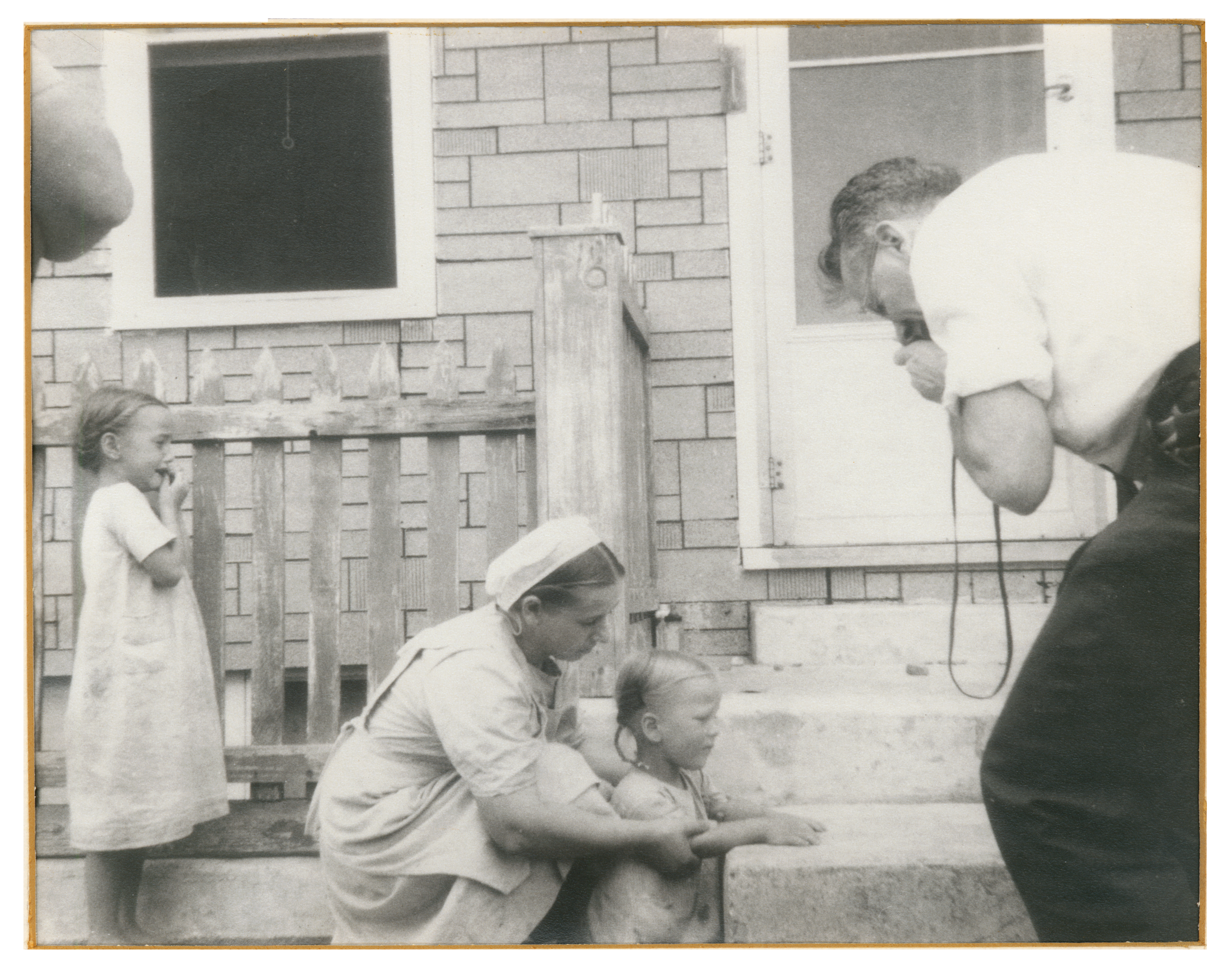
Victor McKusick taking a picture of an Amish child's hands during his study of the Amish.

=== Study of genes among the Amish ===
McKusick's study of genetics among the Amish is perhaps his most famous research. On his first trip to Amish homes, he was accompanied by David Krusen who had an extensive medical practice among the Amish in Lancaster, Pennsylvania. McKusick spoke about his introduction to Krusen's work, stating, "He [Krusen] indicated to the author of the article—in a slick-paper, pharmaceutical company 'throw-away'—that achondroplasia is frequent among the Amish. Initial study led to the identification of two recessive conditions named Ellis–van Creveld syndrome and cartilage-hair hypoplasia (later named metaphyseal chondrodysplasia, McKusick type).

McKusick listed fifteen advantages to studying genetics among the Amish. Today, these fifteen reasons are argued to be true as well. McKusick's findings led many other researchers to study hereditary related diseases in the 1960s and 1970s. Other researchers and McKusick cite the Amish as working cooperatively with researchers to determine the reason for inherited diseases. McKusick published his official findings from working with the Amish in 1978, titled Medical Genetic Studies of the Amish.

== Awards and honors ==
McKusick received more than 20 honorary degrees throughout and after his career. He was also a member of the United States National Academy of Sciences, the American Philosophical Society, and the American Academy of Arts and Sciences.

Some of the awards he won are listed below:

- Gairdner International Award from The Gairdner Foundation in 1977.
- William Allan Award from The American Society of Human Genetics in 1977.
- NAS Award for Scientific Reviewing from the National Academy of Sciences in 1982.
- George M. Kober Medal from the Association of American Physicians in 1990.
- Benjamin Franklin Medal for Distinguished Achievement in the Sciences from the American Philosophical Society in 1996.
- Albert Lasker Award for Special Achievement in Medical Science from The Lasker Foundation in 1997.
- Japan Prize for Medical Genetics, for pioneering the field of medical genetics, in 2008 from The Japan Prize Foundation.
- McKusick–Nathans Institute of Genetic Medicine at Johns Hopkins Hospital named after McKusick and fellow distinguished geneticist Daniel Nathans.

== Death ==
McKusick died of cancer at the age of 86, on July 22, 2008. He died at his home right outside of Baltimore, in Towson, Maryland. On the 21st, the day before he died, he watched a live-stream of a course on medical genetics from Bar Harbor, Maine, which he helped found and direct in 1960.

== See also ==
- McKusick–Kaufman syndrome
