= BBS5 =

Protein-coding gene in humans

Identifiers
- Aliases: BBS5, Bardet-Biedl syndrome 5
- External IDs: OMIM: 603650; MGI: 1919819; GeneCards: BBS5

Gene location (Human)
Chr.	Chromosome 2 (human)
Band	2q31.1	Start	169,479,480 bp
Band	2q31.1	End	169,506,655 bp

Gene location (Mouse)
Chr.	Chromosome 2 (mouse)
Band	2|2 C2	Start	69,477,515 bp
Band	2|2 C2	End	69,497,915 bp
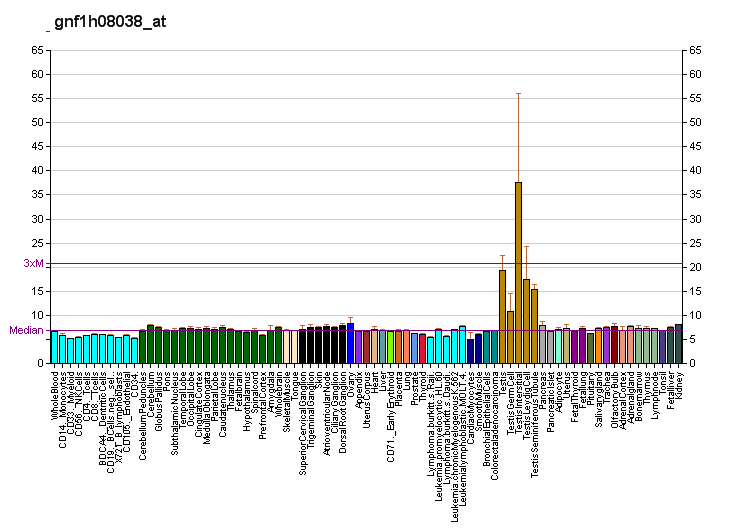
RNA expression pattern
Bgee	Human / Mouse (ortholog); Top expressed in: right uterine tube; testicle; olfactory zone of nasal mucosa; pituitary gland; anterior pituitary; hippocampus proper; temporal lobe; amygdala; nucleus accumbens; Achilles tendon / Top expressed in: spermatid; neural layer of retina; seminiferous tubule; spermatocyte; olfactory epithelium; otolith organ; utricle; zygote; superior cervical ganglion; secondary oocyte; More reference expression data
BioGPS	More reference expression data
Gene ontology
Molecular function	phosphatidylinositol-3-phosphate binding; protein binding
Cellular component	cytoplasm; cytosol; cell projection; BBSome; membrane; plasma membrane; cilium; intracellular anatomical structure; microtubule organizing center; ciliary membrane; cytoskeleton; axoneme; ciliary basal body; centriolar satellite
Biological process	response to stimulus; intracellular transport; heart looping; cell projection organization; melanosome transport; protein transport; motile cilium assembly; visual perception; cilium assembly
Sources:Amigo / QuickGO
Orthologs
Databases	NCBI: entry; OMA: entry
Species	Human	Mouse
Entrez	129880	72569
Ensembl	ENSG00000163093	ENSMUSG00000063145
UniProt	Q8N3I7	Q9CZQ9
RefSeq (mRNA)	NM_152384	NM_028284; NM_001362706
RefSeq (protein)	NP_689597	NP_082560; NP_001349635
Location (UCSC)	Chr 2: 169.48 – 169.51 Mb	Chr 2: 69.48 – 69.5 Mb
PubMed search
- Wikidata
View/Edit Human	View/Edit Mouse

Bardet–Biedl syndrome 5 protein is a protein that in humans is encoded by the BBS5 gene.

This gene encodes a protein that has been directly linked to Bardet–Biedl syndrome. The primary features of this syndrome include retinal dystrophy, obesity, polydactyly, renal abnormalities and learning disabilities. Experimentation in non-human eukaryotes suggests that this gene is expressed in ciliated cells and that it is required for the formation of cilia. Alternate transcriptional splice variants have been observed but have not been fully characterized.
