= BBS12 =

Protein-coding gene in the species Homo sapiens

Identifiers
- Aliases: BBS12, C4orf24, Bardet-Biedl syndrome 12
- External IDs: OMIM: 610683; MGI: 2686651; GeneCards: BBS12

Gene location (Human)
Chr.	Chromosome 4 (human)
Band	4q27	Start	122,732,702 bp
Band	4q27	End	122,744,942 bp

Gene location (Mouse)
Chr.	Chromosome 3 (mouse)
Band	3|3 B	Start	37,366,703 bp
Band	3|3 B	End	37,375,602 bp
RNA expression pattern
Bgee	Human / Mouse (ortholog); Top expressed in: gonad; sperm; bronchial epithelial cell; testicle; germinal epithelium; secondary oocyte; islet of Langerhans; cartilage tissue; jejunal mucosa; caput epididymis / Top expressed in: neural layer of retina; hand; medullary collecting duct; ventricular zone; tail of embryo; renal corpuscle; fossa; embryo; condyle; embryo; More reference expression data
BioGPS	n/a
Gene ontology
Molecular function	protein binding; ATP binding; protein folding chaperone activity; unfolded protein binding
Cellular component	cell projection; cilium; chaperonin-containing T-complex
Biological process	photoreceptor cell maintenance; negative regulation of fat cell differentiation; chaperone-mediated protein complex assembly; eating behavior; intraciliary transport; 'de novo' protein folding; chaperone-mediated protein folding
Sources:Amigo / QuickGO
Orthologs
Databases	NCBI: entry; OMA: entry
Species	Human	Mouse
Entrez	166379	241950
Ensembl	ENSG00000181004	ENSMUSG00000051444
UniProt	Q6ZW61	Q5SUD9
RefSeq (mRNA)	NM_001178007; NM_152618	NM_001008502; NM_001255992
RefSeq (protein)	NP_001171478; NP_689831	NP_001008502; NP_001242921
Location (UCSC)	Chr 4: 122.73 – 122.74 Mb	Chr 3: 37.37 – 37.38 Mb
PubMed search
- Wikidata
View/Edit Human	View/Edit Mouse

Bardet–Biedl syndrome 12 is a protein that in humans is encoded by the BBS12 gene.

Mutations in this gene are associated with the Bardet–Biedl syndrome.
