= McKusick–Kaufman syndrome =

- McKusick–Kaufman syndrome is inherited in an autosomal recessive manner

McKusick–Kaufman syndrome (MKS) is a rare genetic condition caused by mutations in the MKKS gene, which affect how cells develop and function. It is named after Dr. Robert L. Kaufman and Victor McKusick, who studied the condition and helped identify key features.

MKS can be difficult to recognize in infancy because it resembles Bardet–Biedl syndrome (BBS). While MKS mainly causes extra fingers or toes (postaxial polydactyly), fluid buildup in the vagina (hydrometrocolpos), and heart defects, BBS has more severe symptoms such as vision loss and obesity that usually appear later in life.

MKS is most common in the Old Order Amish population, where it affects about 1 in 10,000 people. The syndrome was first discovered in this group through a genetic method called positional cloning, which helped scientists identify the MKKS gene as the cause of this condition. Its prevalence outside the Amish population remains unknown.

== Presentation ==
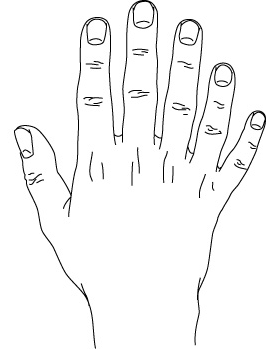
Illustration of postaxial polydactyly in McKusick–Kaufman syndrome.

Clinically, McKusick–Kaufman syndrome is characterized by a combination of three features: postaxial polydactyly, congenital heart disease, and genital abnormalities:

Genital abnormalities may include:

In females:

- Vaginal atresia with hydrometrocolpos
- Urogenital sinus
- Double vagina and/or uterus
- Genitourinary tract fistula
- Ureter stenosis or ureteric atresia

In males:

- Hypospadias
- Chordee
- Cryptorchidism
- Ureter stenosis or ureteric atresia

Postaxial polydactyly and heart defects occur around 35 to 42 days in utero, while genital abnormalities such as uterovaginal plate perforation occurs around the 12th week of development.

== Genetics ==
MKS is characterized by mutations in the MKKS gene on chromosome 20p12.2-p12.1 which is inherited in an autosomal recessive pattern. Both parents of an affected individual must be heterozygous carriers of the pathogenic variant. Heterozygous carriers for MKS show no symptoms of the disorder, nor do they develop the disorder. Each child of these carriers has a 1/4 chance of being affected by MKS, a 1/2 chance of being carriers themselves, and a 1/4 chance of being unaffected and a non carrier.

Determining penetrance for MKS is challenging without molecular genetic analysis, as subtle malformations may be difficult to detect, and the rarity of the syndrome adds to the complexity. Non-penetrance is estimated to occur in at least 9% of Amish males and 3% of Amish females, while penetrance in the non-Amish population remains undetermined. According to studies, this low penetrance in the Amish population could be a result of genetic modifiers that influence the clinical presentation and severity.

MKKS is a six-exon gene that encodes the MKKS protein which has homology with members of the chaperonin family that prevents protein misfolding. This protein has the highest homology with a subunit of a chaperonin complex in the Thermoplasma acidophilum organism, which is structurally similar to a eukaryotic chaperin complex that supports folding of cytoskeletal proteins. The MKKS protein plays an important role in forming cilia, which are tiny hair-like structures on cells that help with movement and signalling. As such, this protein is ubiquitously expressed in development and adulthood. Mutations in MKKS result in a loss of function phenotype; the cilia do not work properly, leading to the symptoms of MKS. In mice, flagella formation failure, retinal degeneration, and deficits in olfaction have been observed.

Two notable MKKS variants that lead to MKS are p.His84Tyr and p.Ala242Ser which were first identified in the Amish population. The allele carrying both homozygous missense mutations (p.[His84Tyr, Ala242Ser]), is found in about 2% of the Amish population, but is rare in other ancestry groups. The MKSS variants are a group of mutations that also contribute to the BSS and thus display the genetic overlap between MKKS and BSS. These have provided sights to the genetic underpinning of those disorders.

Today, over 40 mutations across the gene are associated with MKS or BBS, including nonsense, missense, insertion, and deletion mutations. Studies of families with MKKS mutations most commonly show a phenotype involving truncation of the normal MKKS protein. However, not all variants have been linked to a pathogenic phenotype.

There are advancements in genetic testing, that have improved the diagnostic accuracy, such as multigene panels, which provide a better understanding of these mutations and their roles in MKS and other related ciliopathies.

== Diagnosis ==
The diagnosis of MKS in a proband is based on clinical findings and can be confirmed through genetic testing. Molecular confirmation requires the identification of biallelic pathogenic or likely pathogenic variants in MKKS. Given the considerable similarity in clinical features between MKS and Bardet-Biedl syndrome, ruling out BBS is essential for an accurate diagnosis. In the neonatal period, it is difficult to distinguish between MKS and BBS because the age-dependent features of BBS, such as retinal dystrophy, learning disability, obesity, and renal failure, have not yet developed. The clinical diagnosis of MKS is typically confirmed by age five, when the individual does not meet the criteria for BBS or exhibit features that suggest a different diagnosis. Early diagnosis is important to prevent complications and ensure the appropriate treatment for each child.

If pathogenic variants in the MKKS gene are identified within a family, carrier screening for at-risk relatives, prenatal testing for pregnancies at increased risk, and preimplantation genetic testing may be considered. However, the reliability of prenatal ultrasound for diagnosing MKS is uncertain, as the features associated with the syndrome can vary and may not be evident until after birth.

Molecular testing for MKS usually involves multigene panels or comprehensive genomic testing. Single-gene testing for MKKS alone is not recommended, as Bardet-Biedl syndrome can result from variants in multiple genes, including MKKS. Using a multigene panel that includes MKKS and genes associated with BBS improves diagnostic accuracy and reduces the likelihood of identifying variants of uncertain significance. In cases where other diagnoses are being considered, broader approaches like exome or genome sequencing may be used.

== Treatment ==
The management of MKS is symptom-based, with treatment focused on addressing the specific manifestations of the syndrome. Surgical intervention may be necessary for conditions like polydactyly, hydrometrocolpos, and congenital heart disease. Ongoing monitoring and prompt care are essential for the management of associated complications.

In female newborns with hydrometrocolpos, prompt surgical intervention is required to remove the vaginal obstruction (such as resecting an imperforate hymen or vaginal septum) and drain the accumulated fluid. Severe hydrometrocolpos can cause significant abdominal distension and diaphragmatic compression, so careful neonatal management (including caution with anesthesia and respiratory support) is critical. Postaxial polydactyly is typically addressed with surgical excision or reconstruction in infancy or early childhood, following standard orthopedic or plastic surgical practices. Any congenital heart defect (e.g., atrial or ventricular septal defects) is managed according to standard cardiology guidelines; patients may require medical therapy or surgical correction of the heart anomaly, depending on its nature and severity. Other malformations (such as hypospadias in males) are treated with routine surgical or medical approaches by the appropriate specialists.

After initial treatments, ongoing monitoring and follow-up care are essential to detect complications and any emerging features of overlapping syndromes. Surgical repair of hydrometrocolpos can sometimes have later complications (such as scar tissue causing recurrent obstruction), so periodic pelvic examinations or ultrasounds may be indicated to ensure the genital outflow remains patent.

Surveillance for Disorders with Overlapping Features

Given the clinical overlap between McKusick–Kaufman syndrome and Bardet–Biedl syndrome, surveillance for BBS manifestations is a crucial part of management. This includes regular growth and nutritional assessments (to monitor for excessive weight gain or short stature), developmental evaluations, annual ophthalmologic examinations (with electroretinography) to check for any retinal degeneration, and periodic renal ultrasounds to screen for kidney abnormalities. If an individual develops severe chronic constipation, a prompt evaluation (e.g., rectal biopsy) for Hirschsprung's disease is recommended, as this condition has been reported in the spectrum of overlapping syndromes. Early recognition and treatment of any emerging issues can significantly improve long-term outcomes. The emerging tools like retinal imaging and renal function panels in early childhood are being used to distinguish between MKS and BBS. Even before visual symptoms arise, Optical coherence tomography (OCT) and electroretinograms (ERG) detect signs of retinal degeneration, which help in early classification.

Genetic Counselling

Genetic counselling is an important component of management for MKS families. McKusick–Kaufman syndrome is inherited in an autosomal recessive manner, so each child of carrier parents has a 25% chance of being affected in each pregnancy. Parents are informed of this recurrence risk and offered carrier testing for at-risk relatives if the familial MKKS pathogenic variants are known. Additionally, if the specific mutations have been identified in a family, options such as prenatal genetic testing and preimplantation genetic testing can be discussed for future pregnancies.

== See also ==
- Bardet–Biedl syndrome
- Dominance (genetics)
- MKKS
- Ciliopathy
