= LZTFL1 =

Protein-coding gene in the species Homo sapiens

Identifiers
- Aliases: LZTFL1, BBS17, leucine zipper transcription factor like 1
- External IDs: OMIM: 606568; MGI: 1934860; GeneCards: LZTFL1

Gene location (Human)
| Chr. | Chromosome 3 (human) |
| Band | 3p21.31 | Start | 45,823,316 bp |
| Band | 3p21.31 | End | 45,916,042 bp |

Gene location (Mouse)
| Chr. | Chromosome 9 (mouse) |
| Band | 9 F4|9 74.36 cM | Start | 123,523,481 bp |
| Band | 9 F4|9 74.36 cM | End | 123,546,762 bp |
RNA expression pattern
| Bgee | Human / Mouse (ortholog); Top expressed in: bronchial epithelial cell; sperm; Brodmann area 23; caput epididymis; endothelial cell; Epithelium of choroid plexus; middle temporal gyrus; left testis; right testis; tendon of biceps brachii / Top expressed in: spermatid; spermatocyte; tail of embryo; genital tubercle; seminiferous tubule; zygote; secondary oocyte; olfactory epithelium; thymus; parotid gland; More reference expression data |
| BioGPS | n/a |
Gene ontology
| Molecular function | protein binding; identical protein binding; protein-containing complex binding |
| Cellular component | cytoplasm; cytosol |
| Biological process | negative regulation of protein localization to cilium; negative regulation of protein localization to ciliary membrane |
Sources:Amigo / QuickGO
Orthologs
| Databases | NCBI: entry; OMA: entry |
| Species | Human | Mouse |
| Entrez | 54585 | 93730 |
| Ensembl | ENSG00000163818 | ENSMUSG00000025245 |
| UniProt | Q9NQ48 | Q9JHQ5 |
| RefSeq (mRNA) | NM_001276378; NM_001276379; NM_020347; NM_001386451; NM_001386452 | NM_033322 |
| RefSeq (protein) | NP_001263307; NP_001263308; NP_065080 | NP_201579 |
| Location (UCSC) | Chr 3: 45.82 – 45.92 Mb | Chr 9: 123.52 – 123.55 Mb |
| PubMed search |
- Wikidata
| View/Edit Human | View/Edit Mouse |

Leucine zipper transcription factor like 1 also known as LZTFL1 is a ubiquitously expressed protein which localizes to the cytoplasm and in humans is encoded by the LZTFL1 gene.

== Function ==
This protein regulates protein trafficking to the ciliary membrane through interaction with the Bardet-Biedl syndrome (BBS) complex of proteins.

== Clinical significance ==
Mutations in the LZTFL1 gene are associated with Bardet-Biedl syndrome, and the gene also acts as a tumor suppressor through regulation of epithelial-mesenchymal transition.

Identified as the gene on chromosome 3 at location 3p21.31 responsible for mediating an associated with genetic susceptibility to SARS-CoV-2 infection and COVID-19 respiratory failure. The DNA segment conferring the risk is inherited from Neanderthals.
