= Lake McKusick =

Lake in the state of Minnesota, United States

- Location within Minnesota
- Location: Washington County, Minnesota
- Coordinates: 45°3′43″N 92°49′40″W
- Type: lake

Lake McKusick is a lake in Washington County, in the U.S. state of Minnesota.

Lake McKusick was named for John McKusick, an early settler who later became a state legislator.

== See also ==
- List of lakes in Minnesota
