= BBS10 =

Gene

Identifiers
- Aliases: BBS10, C12orf58, Bardet-Biedl syndrome 10
- External IDs: OMIM: 610148; MGI: 1919019; GeneCards: BBS10

Gene location (Human)
Chr.	Chromosome 12 (human)
Band	12q21.2	Start	76,344,474 bp
Band	12q21.2	End	76,348,415 bp

Gene location (Mouse)
Chr.	Chromosome 10 (mouse)
Band	10|10 D1	Start	111,134,540 bp
Band	10|10 D1	End	111,137,588 bp
RNA expression pattern
Bgee	Human / Mouse (ortholog); Top expressed in: Achilles tendon; endothelial cell; ventricular zone; ganglionic eminence; Epithelium of choroid plexus; retinal pigment epithelium; Brodmann area 23; germinal epithelium; islet of Langerhans; bronchial epithelial cell / Top expressed in: spermatocyte; otolith organ; spermatid; utricle; genital tubercle; lumbar spinal ganglion; seminiferous tubule; zygote; tail of embryo; oocyte; More reference expression data
BioGPS	n/a
Gene ontology
Molecular function	nucleotide binding; protein binding; ATP binding
Cellular component	cell projection; cilium
Biological process	photoreceptor cell maintenance; retina homeostasis; regulation of protein-containing complex assembly; chaperone-mediated protein complex assembly; response to stimulus; visual perception; non-motile cilium assembly
Sources:Amigo / QuickGO
Orthologs
Databases	NCBI: entry; OMA: entry
Species	Human	Mouse
Entrez	79738	71769
Ensembl	ENSG00000179941	ENSMUSG00000035759
UniProt	Q8TAM1	Q9DBI2
RefSeq (mRNA)	NM_024685	NM_027914
RefSeq (protein)	NP_078961	NP_082190
Location (UCSC)	Chr 12: 76.34 – 76.35 Mb	Chr 10: 111.13 – 111.14 Mb
PubMed search
- Wikidata
View/Edit Human	View/Edit Mouse

BBSome complex assembly protein BBS10, also known as Bardet–Biedl syndrome 10 protein, is encoded in the human by the BBS10 gene.

== Function ==
The Bardet-Biedl syndrome 10 protein has distant sequence homology to type II chaperonins. As a molecular chaperone, this protein may affect the folding or stability of other ciliary or basal body proteins. Inhibition of this protein's expression impairs ciliogenesis in preadipocytes.

== Clinical significance ==
Mutations in this gene are associated with the Bardet–Biedl syndrome.
