= MKKS =

Protein-coding gene in the species Homo sapiens

Identifiers
- Aliases: MKKS, BBS6, HMCS, KMS, MKS, McKusick-Kaufman syndrome, MKKS centrosomal shuttling protein
- External IDs: OMIM: 604896; MGI: 1891836; GeneCards: MKKS

Gene location (Mouse)
Chr.	Chromosome 2 (mouse)
Band	2|2 F3	Start	136,715,700 bp
Band	2|2 F3	End	136,733,309 bp
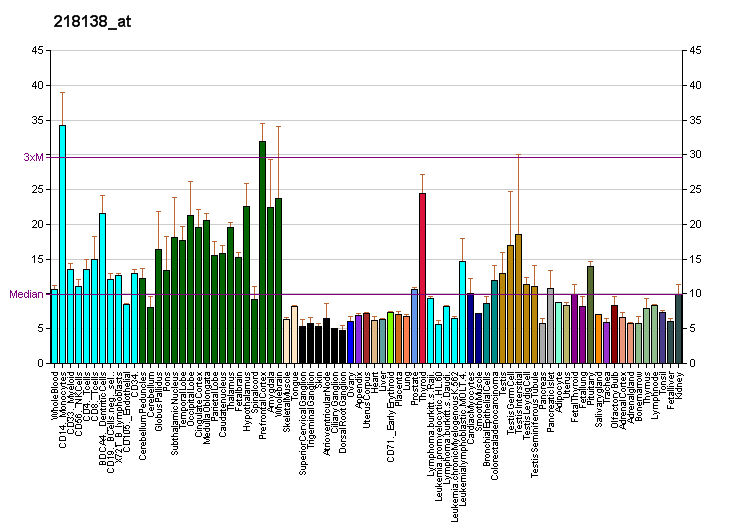
RNA expression pattern
Bgee	Human / Mouse (ortholog); Top expressed in: middle temporal gyrus; caudate nucleus; left ventricle; Brodmann area 9; nucleus accumbens / Top expressed in: dentate gyrus of hippocampal formation granule cell; muscle of thigh; morula; right kidney; blastocyst; proximal tubule; ventricular zone; duodenum; tail of embryo; embryo; More reference expression data
BioGPS	More reference expression data
Gene ontology
Molecular function	nucleotide binding; protein binding; ATP binding; protein folding chaperone activity; unfolded protein binding
Cellular component	cytosol; centrosome; kinociliary basal body; intracellular anatomical structure; microtubule organizing center; motile cilium; cytoskeleton; ciliary basal body; cytoplasm; nucleus; membrane; integral component of membrane
Biological process	pigment granule aggregation in cell center; regulation of cilium beat frequency involved in ciliary motility; chaperone-mediated protein complex assembly; negative regulation of actin filament polymerization; negative regulation of appetite by leptin-mediated signaling pathway; response to stimulus; negative regulation of blood pressure; convergent extension involved in gastrulation; leptin-mediated signaling pathway; vasodilation; intracellular transport; negative regulation of gene expression; regulation of stress fiber assembly; detection of mechanical stimulus involved in sensory perception of sound; heart looping; sensory perception of smell; development of the heart; cartilage development; face development; determination of left/right symmetry; negative regulation of GTPase activity; protein folding; melanosome transport; spermatid development; artery smooth muscle contraction; cerebral cortex development; positive regulation of multicellular organism growth; social behavior; photoreceptor cell maintenance; response to leptin; hippocampus development; gonad development; fat cell differentiation; striatum development; visual perception; brain morphogenesis; 'de novo' protein folding; chaperone-mediated protein folding; non-motile cilium assembly; cilium assembly; developmental process
Sources:Amigo / QuickGO
Orthologs
Databases	NCBI: entry; OMA: entry
Species	Human	Mouse
Entrez	8195	59030
Ensembl	ENSG00000125863	ENSMUSG00000027274
UniProt	Q9NPJ1; Q9HB66	Q9JI70
RefSeq (mRNA)	NM_018848; NM_170784; NM_001394148; NM_001394149	NM_001141946; NM_001286981; NM_001286983; NM_021527
RefSeq (protein)	NP_061336; NP_740754	NP_001135418; NP_001273910; NP_001273912; NP_067502
Location (UCSC)	n/a	Chr 2: 136.72 – 136.73 Mb
PubMed search
- Wikidata
View/Edit Human	View/Edit Mouse

McKusick–Kaufman/Bardet–Biedl syndromes putative chaperonin is a protein that in humans is encoded by the MKKS gene.

This gene encodes a protein with sequence similarity to the chaperonin family. The encoded protein may have a role in protein processing in limb, cardiac and reproductive system development. Mutations in this gene have been observed in patients with Bardet–Biedl syndrome type 6 and McKusick–Kaufman syndrome. Two transcript variants encoding the same protein have been identified for this gene.
