= Bardet–Biedl syndrome =

Ciliopathic recessive genetic disorder

- Other names: Biedl-Bardet syndrome
- This condition is often inherited via autosomal recessive manner (including digenic recessive); but epigenetic phenomena also cause some of the variation seen in BBS.
- Specialty: Medical genetics
- Differential diagnosis: McKusick-Kaufman syndrome 2q37 deletion syndrome Borjeson-Forssman-Lehmann syndrome Prader-Willi syndrome
- Frequency: 0.005%

Bardet–Biedl syndrome (BBS) is a ciliopathic human genetic disorder that produces many effects and affects many body systems. It is characterized by rod/cone dystrophy, polydactyly, central obesity, hypogonadism, and kidney dysfunction in some cases. Historically, slower mental processing has also been considered a principal symptom but is now not regarded as such.

== Signs and symptoms ==
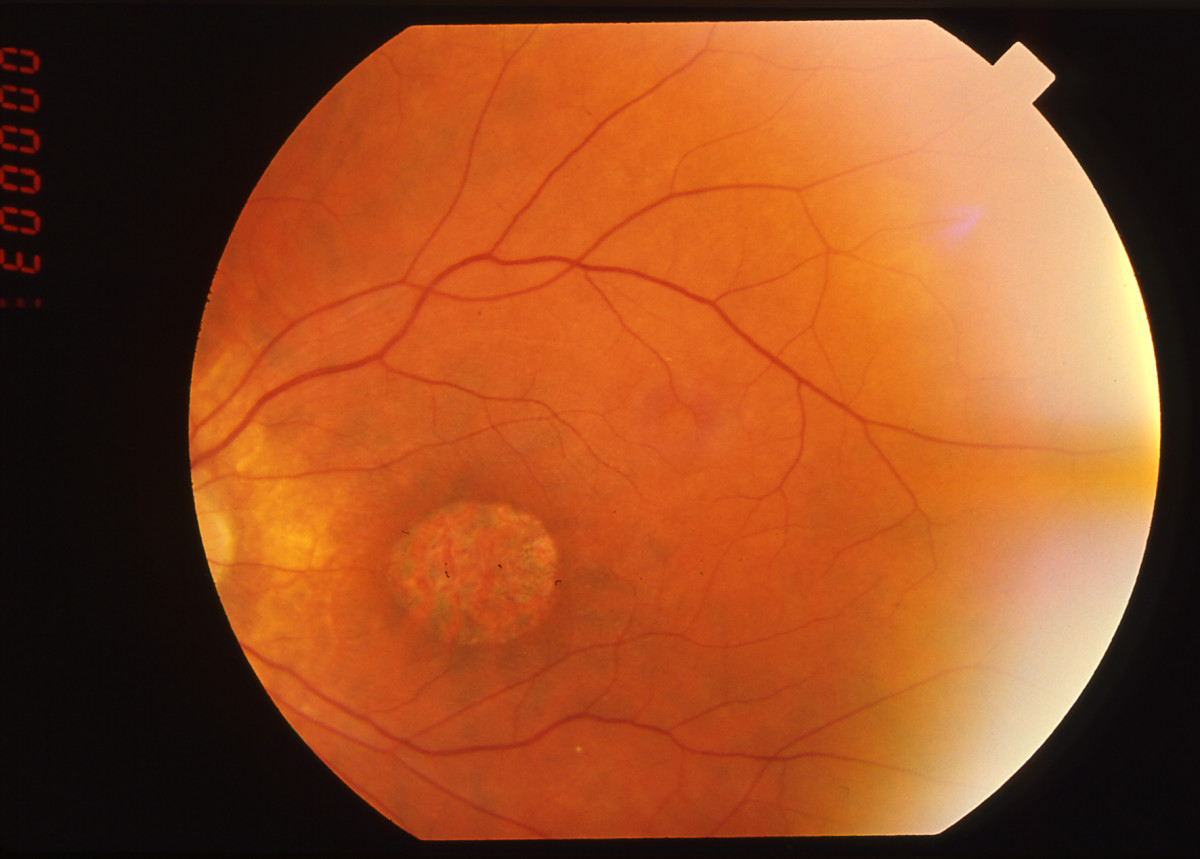
Fundus of a 31 year-old patient with Bardet Biedl syndrome. The peripheral retina does not show any large lesion but the macula is atrophic.

Bardet–Biedl syndrome is a pleiotropic disorder with variable expressivity and a wide range of clinical variability observed both within and between families. The most common clinical features are rod–cone dystrophy, with childhood-onset night-blindness followed by increasing visual loss; postaxial polydactyly; truncal obesity that manifests during infancy and remains problematic throughout adulthood; varying degrees of learning disabilities; male hypogenitalism and complex female genitourinary malformations; and renal dysfunction, a major cause of morbidity and mortality.

There is a wide range of secondary features that are sometimes associated with BBS including

- Strabismus, cataracts, astigmatism, pigmentary retinopathy, poor visual acuity, low vision, and/or blindness caused by an impaired photoreceptor transport mechanism in the retina.
- "Brachydactyly, syndactyly of both the hands and feet is common, as is partial syndactyl (most usually between the second and third toes)"
- Polyuria/polydipsia (nephrogenic diabetes insipidus)
- Ataxia/poor coordination/imbalance
- Mild hypertonia (especially lower limbs)
- Diabetes mellitus
- Hepatic involvement
- Anosmia
- Auditory deficiencies
- Hirschsprung disease and subsequent bowel obstruction has been described.
- Hypertrophy of interventricular septum and left ventricle and dilated cardiomyopathy.
- Hypogonadism, kidney failure, urogenital sinuses, ectopic urethra, uterus duplex, septate vagina, and hypoplasia of the uterus, ovaries, and fallopian tubes
- Speech disorder/delay
- Developmental delay, especially of fine and gross motor skills

=== Relation to other rare genetic disorders ===
Findings in genetic research published in 2006 have suggested that a large number of genetic disorders, both genetic syndromes and genetic diseases, that were not previously identified in the medical literature as related, may be, in fact, highly related in the genetypical root cause of the widely varying, phenotypically observed disorders. BBS is one such syndrome that has now been identified to be caused by defects in the cellular ciliary structure. Thus, BBS is a ciliopathy. Other known ciliopathies include primary ciliary dyskinesia, polycystic kidney and liver disease, nephronophthisis, Alström syndrome, Meckel–Gruber syndrome and some forms of retinal degeneration.

== Pathophysiology ==
The detailed biochemical mechanism that leads to BBS is still unclear.

The gene products encoded by these BBS genes, called BBS proteins, are located in the basal body and cilia of the cell.Using the round worm C. elegans as a model system, biologists found that BBS proteins are involved in a process called intraflagellar transport (IFT), a bi-directional transportation activity within the cilia along the long axis of the ciliary shaft that is essential for ciliogenesis and the maintenance of cilia. Recent biochemical analysis of human BBS proteins revealed that BBS proteins are assembled into a multiple protein complex, called "BBSome". BBSome is proposed to be responsible for transporting intracellular vesicles to the base of the cilia and to play an important role in the ciliary function.

Since abnormalities of cilia are known to be related to a wide range of disease symptoms including those commonly seen in BBS patients, it is now widely accepted that mutated BBS genes affect normal cilia function, which, in turn, causes BBS.

A theory that photoreceptor cells are nourished by the IFT of retinal cilia now offers a potential explanation for the retinal dystrophy common in BBS patients after their early years of life.

As of 2024, 26 different genes had been identified. Genes involved include:

- BBsome: BBS1, BBS2, ARL6/BBS3, BBS4, BBS5, BBS7, TTC8/BBS8, BBS10, TRIM32/BBS11 BBS12, CCDC28B, CEP290, TMEM67, MKS1, MKKS
- chaperone: BBS6

== Diagnosis ==
The diagnosis of BBS is established by clinical findings and family history. Molecular genetic testing can be used to confirm the diagnosis. Multigene panels offer the most effective approach in achieving molecular confirmation of BBS.

== Management ==
There is currently no comprehensive treatment for all symptoms associated with the syndrome. Clinical management can be undertaken by an experienced multidisciplinary team manages patients with adequate supportive treatments.Setmelanotide (marketed as Imcivree) was approved for treatment of obesity and the control of hunger associated with genetically confirmed BBS by the European Medicines Agency in 2021 and for weight management in patients with BBS aged 6 or older by the FDA in 2022.Gene therapies for retinal degeneration are in development for at least two BBS genes. Axovia's BBSAXV-101 for treatment of retinal degeneration caused by BBS1 was licensed for a Phase I/II Clinical Trial in the UK by the MHRA in 2025.

== Eponym ==
The syndrome is named after Georges Bardet and Arthur Biedl after they reported the first official cases in 1920 and 1922. The first known case was reported by Laurence and Moon in 1866 at the Ophthalmic Hospital in South London. Laurence–Moon–Biedl–Bardet syndrome is no longer considered as valid terms in that patients of Laurence and Moon had paraplegia but no polydactyly or obesity, which are the key elements of the Bardet–Biedl syndrome. Laurence–Moon syndrome is usually considered a separate entity. However, some recent research suggests that the two conditions may not be distinct.
