= Meckelin =

Protein-coding gene in the species Homo sapiens

TMEM67

Identifiers
- Aliases: TMEM67, JBTS6, MECKELIN, MKS3, NPHP11, TNEM67, transmembrane protein 67
- External IDs: OMIM: 609884; MGI: 1923928; GeneCards: TMEM67

Gene location (Human)
Chr.	Chromosome 8 (human)
Band	8q22.1	Start	93,754,844 bp
Band	8q22.1	End	93,819,234 bp

Gene location (Mouse)
Chr.	Chromosome 4 (mouse)
Band	4|4 A1	Start	12,039,355 bp
Band	4|4 A1	End	12,090,020 bp
RNA expression pattern
Bgee	Human / Mouse (ortholog); Top expressed in: buccal mucosa cell; right uterine tube; Achilles tendon; bronchial epithelial cell; olfactory zone of nasal mucosa; ventricular zone; left ventricle; anterior pituitary; gonad; left testis / Top expressed in: spermatocyte; spermatid; tail of embryo; genital tubercle; neural layer of retina; ventricular zone; zygote; right kidney; primary visual cortex; lumbar subsegment of spinal cord; More reference expression data
BioGPS	n/a
Gene ontology
Molecular function	unfolded protein binding; filamin binding; protein binding
Cellular component	cytoplasm; integral component of membrane; centrosome; cell projection; MKS complex; endoplasmic reticulum membrane; membrane; plasma membrane; cilium; endoplasmic reticulum; ciliary membrane; cytoskeleton; cytoplasmic vesicle membrane; ciliary transition zone
Biological process	negative regulation of centrosome duplication; cell projection organization; ubiquitin-dependent ERAD pathway; cilium assembly; ciliary basal body-plasma membrane docking
Sources:Amigo / QuickGO
Orthologs
Databases	NCBI: entry; OMA: entry
Species	Human	Mouse
Entrez	91147	329795
Ensembl	ENSG00000164953	ENSMUSG00000049488
UniProt	Q5HYA8	Q8BR76
RefSeq (mRNA)	NM_001142301; NM_153704	NM_177861
RefSeq (protein)	NP_001135773; NP_714915	NP_808529
Location (UCSC)	Chr 8: 93.75 – 93.82 Mb	Chr 4: 12.04 – 12.09 Mb
PubMed search
- Wikidata
View/Edit Human	View/Edit Mouse

Meckelin is a protein that in humans is encoded by the TMEM67 gene.

== Function ==
The protein encoded by this gene localizes to the primary cilium and to the plasma membrane. The gene functions in centriole migration to the apical membrane and formation of the primary cilium. Multiple transcript variants encoding different isoforms have been found for this gene.

== Clinical significance ==
Defects in this gene are a cause of Meckel syndrome type 3 (MKS3), nephronophthisis and Joubert syndrome type 6 (JBTS6).

== See also ==
- Meckel syndrome
