= BBS4 =

Protein-coding gene in the species Homo sapiens

Identifiers
- Aliases: BBS4, Bardet-Biedl syndrome 4
- External IDs: OMIM: 600374; MGI: 2143311; GeneCards: BBS4

Gene location (Human)
| Chr. | Chromosome 15 (human) |
| Band | 15q24.1 | Start | 72,686,179 bp |
| Band | 15q24.1 | End | 72,738,475 bp |

Gene location (Mouse)
| Chr. | Chromosome 9 (mouse) |
| Band | 9 B|9 32.01 cM | Start | 59,229,273 bp |
| Band | 9 B|9 32.01 cM | End | 59,260,791 bp |
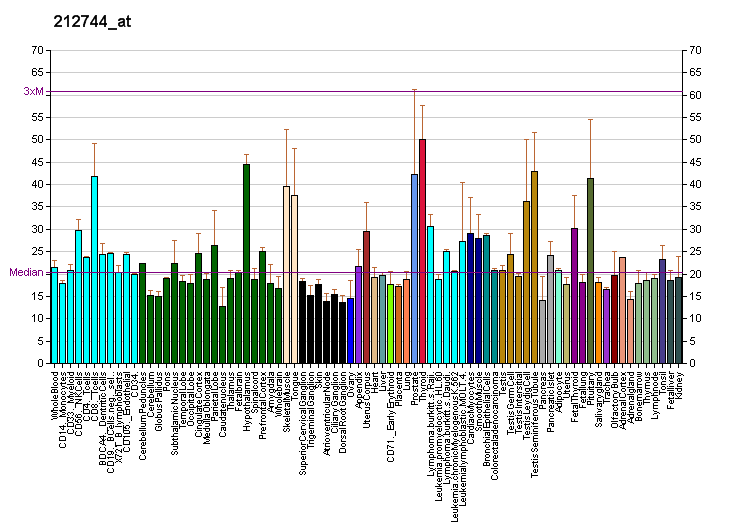

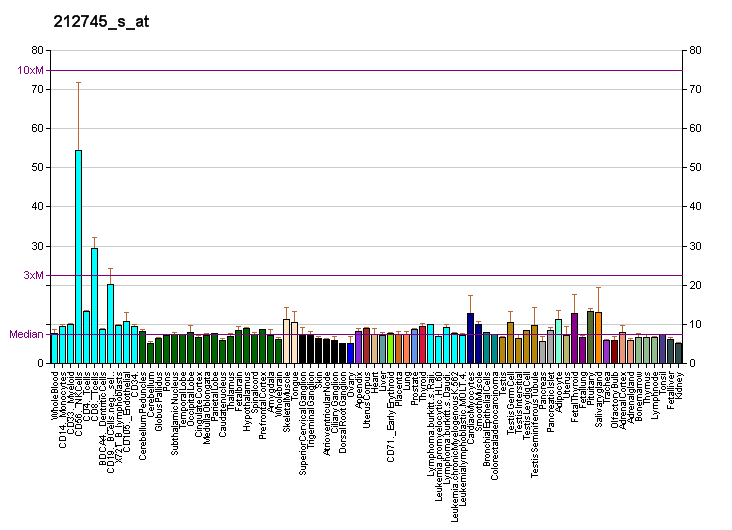
RNA expression pattern
| Bgee | Human / Mouse (ortholog); Top expressed in: right uterine tube; oocyte; secondary oocyte; anterior pituitary; right lobe of thyroid gland; ventricular zone; left ovary; left lobe of thyroid gland; right testis; left testis / Top expressed in: primary oocyte; spermatocyte; zygote; secondary oocyte; spermatid; olfactory epithelium; neural layer of retina; dorsomedial hypothalamic nucleus; facial motor nucleus; epithelium of lens; More reference expression data |
| BioGPS | More reference expression data |
Gene ontology
| Molecular function | microtubule motor activity; dynactin binding; alpha-tubulin binding; protein binding; beta-tubulin binding |
| Cellular component | cytoplasm; ciliary basal body; centrosome; cell projection; BBSome; pericentriolar material; membrane; photoreceptor inner segment; plasma membrane; photoreceptor outer segment; cilium; centriolar satellite; ciliary transition zone; photoreceptor connecting cilium; microtubule organizing center; ciliary membrane; centriole; motile cilium; cytoskeleton; nucleus; cytosol; non-motile cilium |
| Biological process | protein localization to organelle; fat pad development; cilium assembly; regulation of cilium beat frequency involved in ciliary motility; protein localization; regulation of cytokinesis; negative regulation of actin filament polymerization; negative regulation of appetite by leptin-mediated signaling pathway; response to stimulus; leptin-mediated signaling pathway; dendrite development; mitotic cytokinesis; sensory processing; intracellular transport; neuron migration; photoreceptor cell outer segment organization; negative regulation of gene expression; ventricular system development; regulation of stress fiber assembly; protein localization to photoreceptor outer segment; heart looping; sensory perception of smell; regulation of lipid metabolic process; face development; neural tube closure; retina homeostasis; adult behavior; negative regulation of GTPase activity; cell projection organization; protein localization to cilium; melanosome transport; retinal rod cell development; spermatid development; positive regulation of multicellular organism growth; cerebral cortex development; protein transport; social behavior; protein localization to centrosome; positive regulation of cilium assembly; photoreceptor cell maintenance; regulation of non-motile cilium assembly; response to leptin; negative regulation of systemic arterial blood pressure; hippocampus development; fat cell differentiation; microtubule cytoskeleton organization; maintenance of protein location in nucleus; striatum development; microtubule anchoring at centrosome; visual perception; brain morphogenesis; non-motile cilium assembly; centrosome cycle |
Sources:Amigo / QuickGO
Orthologs
| Databases | NCBI: entry; OMA: entry |
| Species | Human | Mouse |
| Entrez | 585 | 102774 |
| Ensembl | ENSG00000140463 | ENSMUSG00000025235 |
| UniProt | Q96RK4 | Q8C1Z7 |
| RefSeq (mRNA) | NM_001252678; NM_033028; NM_001320665 | NM_175325; NM_001359558 |
| RefSeq (protein) | NP_001239607; NP_001307594; NP_149017 | NP_780534; NP_001346487 |
| Location (UCSC) | Chr 15: 72.69 – 72.74 Mb | Chr 9: 59.23 – 59.26 Mb |
| PubMed search |
- Wikidata
| View/Edit Human | View/Edit Mouse |

Bardet–Biedl syndrome 4 is a protein that in humans is encoded by the BBS4 gene.

This gene encodes a protein which contains tetratricopeptide repeats (TPR), similar to O-linked N-acetylglucosamine transferase. Mutations in this gene have been observed in patients with Bardet–Biedl syndrome type 4. The encoded protein may play a role in pigmentary retinopathy, obesity, polydactyly, renal malformation and intellectual disability.

== Interactions ==
BBS4 has been shown to interact with DCTN1.
