= BBS7 =

Protein-coding gene in the species Homo sapiens

Identifiers
- Aliases: BBS7, BBS2L1, Bardet-Biedl syndrome 7
- External IDs: OMIM: 607590; MGI: 1918742; GeneCards: BBS7

Gene location (Human)
Chr.	Chromosome 4 (human)
Band	4q27	Start	121,824,329 bp
Band	4q27	End	121,870,487 bp

Gene location (Mouse)
Chr.	Chromosome 3 (mouse)
Band	3|3 B	Start	36,627,291 bp
Band	3|3 B	End	36,667,626 bp
RNA expression pattern
Bgee	Human / Mouse (ortholog); Top expressed in: endothelial cell; Achilles tendon; lateral nuclear group of thalamus; Brodmann area 23; primary visual cortex; postcentral gyrus; prefrontal cortex; testicle; superior frontal gyrus; secondary oocyte / Top expressed in: neural layer of retina; ovarian follicle; spermatid; spermatocyte; secondary follicle of ovary; seminiferous tubule; retinal pigment epithelium; genital tubercle; olfactory epithelium; otolith organ; More reference expression data
BioGPS	n/a
Gene ontology
Molecular function	protein binding
Cellular component	cytoplasm; ciliary basal body; cytosol; centrosome; cell projection; BBSome; membrane; plasma membrane; photoreceptor outer segment; cilium; microtubule organizing center; ciliary membrane; axoneme; cytoskeleton; nucleus; neuron projection
Biological process	eye development; protein localization; pigment granule aggregation in cell center; response to stimulus; regulation of transcription by RNA polymerase II; intracellular transport; limb development; heart looping; development of the heart; brain development; determination of left/right symmetry; cell projection organization; melanosome transport; protein transport; smoothened signaling pathway; fat cell differentiation; positive regulation of proteasomal ubiquitin-dependent protein catabolic process; visual perception; digestive tract morphogenesis; cilium assembly; non-motile cilium assembly; primary palate development
Sources:Amigo / QuickGO
Orthologs
Databases	NCBI: entry; OMA: entry
Species	Human	Mouse
Entrez	55212	71492
Ensembl	ENSG00000138686	ENSMUSG00000037325
UniProt	Q8IWZ6	Q8K2G4
RefSeq (mRNA)	NM_018190; NM_176824	NM_027810
RefSeq (protein)	NP_060660; NP_789794	NP_082086
Location (UCSC)	Chr 4: 121.82 – 121.87 Mb	Chr 3: 36.63 – 36.67 Mb
PubMed search
- Wikidata
View/Edit Human	View/Edit Mouse

Bardet–Biedl syndrome 7 is a protein that in humans is encoded by the BBS7 gene.

Mutations in this gene are associated with the Bardet–Biedl syndrome.
