= BBS2 =

Protein-coding gene in the species Homo sapiens

Identifiers
- Aliases: BBS2, BBS, RP74, Bardet-Biedl syndrome 2
- External IDs: OMIM: 606151; MGI: 2135267; GeneCards: BBS2

Gene location (Human)
Chr.	Chromosome 16 (human)
Band	16q13	Start	56,465,640 bp
Band	16q13	End	56,582,667 bp

Gene location (Mouse)
Chr.	Chromosome 8 (mouse)
Band	8|8 C5	Start	94,794,582 bp
Band	8|8 C5	End	94,825,556 bp
RNA expression pattern
Bgee	Human / Mouse (ortholog); Top expressed in: right adrenal cortex; tibial nerve; ventricular zone; left adrenal gland; caudate nucleus; left adrenal cortex; Achilles tendon; putamen; nucleus accumbens; right frontal lobe / Top expressed in: neural layer of retina; spermatocyte; genital tubercle; ventricular zone; tail of embryo; pituitary gland; spermatid; olfactory epithelium; superior frontal gyrus; islet of Langerhans; More reference expression data
BioGPS	n/a
Gene ontology
Molecular function	protein binding
Cellular component	cytoplasm; ciliary basal body; cytosol; cell projection; BBSome; membrane; plasma membrane; cilium; microtubule organizing center; ciliary membrane; motile cilium; cytoskeleton; stereocilium; microvillus; neuron projection
Biological process	protein localization to organelle; protein localization; regulation of cilium beat frequency involved in ciliary motility; negative regulation of appetite by leptin-mediated signaling pathway; response to stimulus; leptin-mediated signaling pathway; negative regulation of multicellular organism growth; vasodilation; negative regulation of gene expression; sperm axoneme assembly; cartilage development; adult behavior; cell projection organization; melanosome transport; artery smooth muscle contraction; positive regulation of multicellular organism growth; cerebral cortex development; protein transport; photoreceptor cell maintenance; response to leptin; hippocampus development; fat cell differentiation; striatum development; visual perception; brain morphogenesis; Golgi to plasma membrane protein transport; cilium assembly; non-motile cilium assembly; protein localization to ciliary membrane
Sources:Amigo / QuickGO
Orthologs
Databases	NCBI: entry; OMA: entry
Species	Human	Mouse
Entrez	583	67378
Ensembl	ENSG00000125124	ENSMUSG00000031755
UniProt	Q9BXC9	Q9CWF6
RefSeq (mRNA)	NM_031885; NM_001377456	NM_026116
RefSeq (protein)	NP_114091; NP_001364385	NP_080392
Location (UCSC)	Chr 16: 56.47 – 56.58 Mb	Chr 8: 94.79 – 94.83 Mb
PubMed search
- Wikidata
View/Edit Human	View/Edit Mouse

Bardet–Biedl syndrome 2 protein is a protein that in humans is encoded by the BBS2 gene.

This gene encodes a protein of unknown function. Mutations in this gene have been observed in patients with Bardet–Biedl syndrome type 2. Bardet–Biedl syndrome is an autosomal recessive disorder characterized by severe pigmentary retinopathy, obesity, polydactyly, renal malformation, and intellectual disability.
