= ARL6 =

Mammalian protein found in Homo sapiens

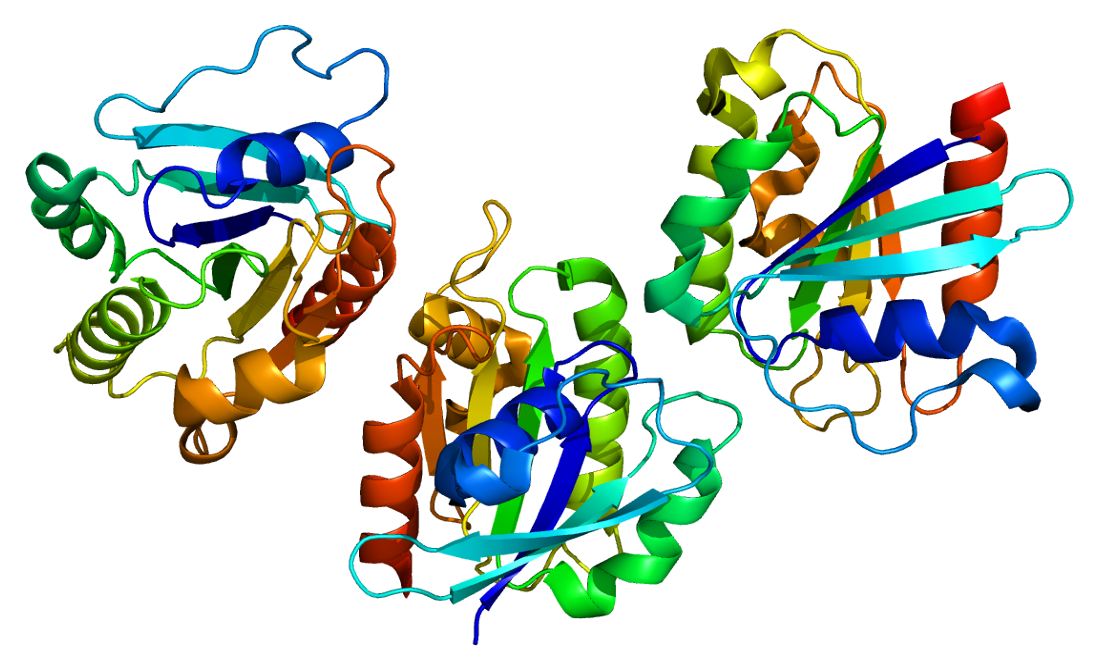

Identifiers
- Aliases: ARL6, BBS3, RP55, ADP-ribosylation factor-like 6, ADP ribosylation factor like GTPase 6
- External IDs: OMIM: 608845; MGI: 1927136; GeneCards: ARL6
Available structures
PDB	Ortholog search: PDBe RCSB
PDB	List of PDB id codes 2H57

Gene location (Human)
Chr.	Chromosome 3 (human)
Band	3q11.2	Start	97,764,521 bp
Band	3q11.2	End	97,801,229 bp

Gene location (Mouse)
Chr.	Chromosome 16 (mouse)
Band	16|16 C1.3	Start	59,433,312 bp
Band	16|16 C1.3	End	59,459,754 bp
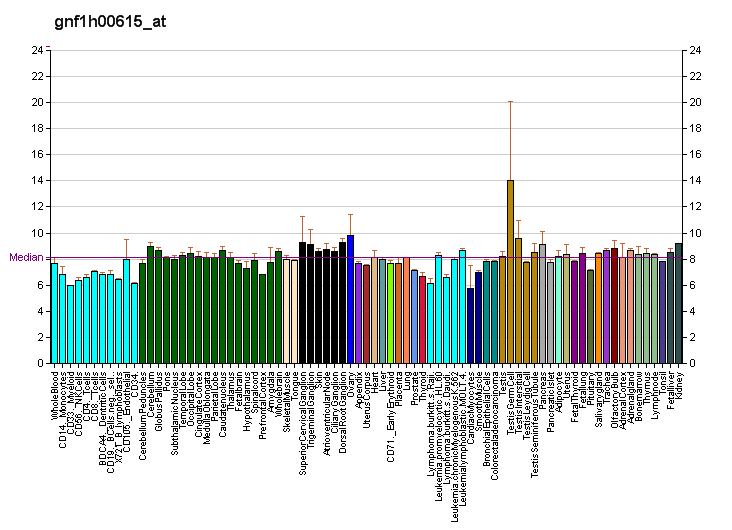
RNA expression pattern
Bgee	Human / Mouse (ortholog); Top expressed in: Brodmann area 23; endothelial cell; middle temporal gyrus; sperm; bronchial epithelial cell; testicle; oocyte; prefrontal cortex; Brodmann area 9; right uterine tube / Top expressed in: olfactory epithelium; retina; neural layer of retina; epithelium of lens; retinal pigment epithelium; Epithelium of choroid plexus; spermatid; vestibular sensory epithelium; spermatocyte; facial motor nucleus; More reference expression data
BioGPS	More reference expression data
Gene ontology
Molecular function	nucleotide binding; GTP binding; metal ion binding; protein binding; phospholipid binding; GTPase activity
Cellular component	cytoplasm; cytosol; cell projection; BBSome; membrane; plasma membrane; intracellular anatomical structure; axoneme; membrane coat; extracellular exosome; cytoskeleton; axonemal microtubule; cilium
Biological process	protein polymerization; retina layer formation; protein localization to non-motile cilium; response to stimulus; protein targeting to membrane; small GTPase mediated signal transduction; Wnt signaling pathway; regulation of smoothened signaling pathway; brain development; determination of left/right symmetry; cell projection organization; protein localization to cilium; melanosome transport; protein transport; fat cell differentiation; visual perception; cilium assembly; protein transport from ciliary membrane to plasma membrane; transport; intracellular protein transport; vesicle-mediated transport
Sources:Amigo / QuickGO
Orthologs
Databases	NCBI: entry; OMA: entry
Species	Human	Mouse
Entrez	84100	56297
Ensembl	ENSG00000113966	ENSMUSG00000022722
UniProt	Q9H0F7	O88848
RefSeq (mRNA)	NM_001278293; NM_032146; NM_177976; NM_001323513; NM_001323514	NM_019665; NM_001347244
RefSeq (protein)	NP_001265222; NP_001310442; NP_001310443; NP_115522; NP_816931	NP_001334173; NP_062639
Location (UCSC)	Chr 3: 97.76 – 97.8 Mb	Chr 16: 59.43 – 59.46 Mb
PubMed search
- Wikidata
View/Edit Human	View/Edit Mouse

ADP-ribosylation factor-like protein 6 is a protein that in humans is encoded by the ARL6 gene.

The protein encoded by this gene belongs to the ARF family of GTP-binding proteins. ARF proteins are important regulators of cellular traffic and are the founding members of an expanding family of homologous proteins and genomic sequences. They depart from other small GTP-binding proteins by a unique structural device that implements front-back communication from the N-terminus to the nucleotide-binding site. Studies of the mouse ortholog of this protein suggest an involvement in protein transport, membrane trafficking, or cell signaling during hematopoietic maturation. Alternative splicing occurs at this locus and two transcript variants encoding the same protein have been described.
