= Ciliopathy =

Genetic disease resulting in abnormal formation or function of cilia

- Eukaryotic cilium
- Specialty: Medical genetics

Ciliopathies are a group of genetically diverse disorders involving defects in the structure or function of the primary cilium, a highly specialized and evolutionarily conserved organelle found in nearly all eukaryotic cells. The primary cilium plays a central role in regulating signal transduction, making it essential for numerous developmental and physiological processes.

Because of the widespread presence of primary cilia in different tissues, dysfunction can lead to a broad spectrum of clinical features. Syndromic ciliopathies, such as Bardet-Biedl syndrome (BBS), typically involve multiple organ systems, including the retina, kidneys, central nervous system, and skeletal system. These manifestations highlight the importance of cilia in embryonic development, sensory perception, and tissue homeostasis.

The genetic basis of ciliopathies is complex, with significant allelic heterogeneity and pleiotropy, meaning the same gene may cause different disorders, while different mutations can result in overlapping clinical features. Such variability makes genotype-phenotype correlation particularly challenging. Advances in genetic technologies, such as expression quantitative trait locus (eQTL) analysis, are helping to clarify the molecular mechanisms that drive these diseases. While progress has been made in understanding ciliogenesis and the molecular pathways involved, therapeutic development is still in its early stages. Gene therapy and other molecular approaches hold promise but must overcome several scientific and technical barriers before they can be widely implemented.

Primary cilia, which are found on nearly all cell types, function as sensory structures and integrate signals from the environment. When these functions are compromised, it can lead to serious diseases such as polycystic kidney disease, Bardet-Biedl syndrome, Joubert syndrome, and primary ciliary dyskinesia. Even proteins that are not directly localized to the cilia, such as XPNPEP3—which is associated with mitochondria—can cause ciliopathies by affecting proteins essential to ciliary function.

In the 1990s, important advances were made in understanding the significance of cilia. Ciliary defects were identified in genetic disorders such as nephronophthisis and primary ciliary dyskinesia, and it became clear that abnormalities in ciliary structure and transport mechanisms could explain the broad, multi-organ effects observed in patients with ciliopathies.

Although our understanding of the role of cilia in developmental biology and disease has grown considerably over the past decade, the mechanisms behind their function in many tissues remain incompletely described. Current research is particularly focused on how disruptions in intraflagellar transport, signal reception, and cilia-associated protein complexes contribute to the pathogenesis of ciliopathies.

== Signs and symptoms ==
A wide variety of symptoms are potential clinical features of ciliopathy. The signs most exclusive to a ciliopathy, in descending order of exclusivity, are:

- Dandy–Walker malformation (cerebellar vermis hypoplasia, usually with hydrocephalus)
- Agenesis of the corpus callosum
- Situs inversus
- Posterior encephalocele
- Polycystic kidneys
- Postaxial polydactyly
- Liver disease
- Retinitis pigmentosa
- Intellectual disability

A case with polyendocrine metabolic ovarian syndrome (PMOS), multiple subcutaneous cysts, renal function impairment, Caroli disease and liver cirrhosis due to ciliopathy has been described.

Phenotypes sometimes associated with ciliopathies can include:

- Abnormal heart size
- Anencephaly
- Anosmia
- Breathing abnormalities
- Cerebellar vermis hypoplasia
- Congenital heart defects
- Diabetes
- Exencephaly
- Eye movement abnormalities
- Hydrocephalus
- Hypertension
- Hypoplasia of the corpus callosum
- Hypotonia
- Infertility
- Cognitive impairment/defects
- Obesity
- Other polydactyly
- Respiratory dysfunction
- Renal cystic disease
- Retinal degeneration
- Sensorineural deafness
- Skeletal anomalies
- Spina bifida

Although significant progress has been made in understanding cilia and their role in disease, many aspects remain unexplored. Ongoing research is crucial to uncover the underlying mechanisms of ciliopathies and to develop effective therapeutic strategies.

== Pathophysiology ==
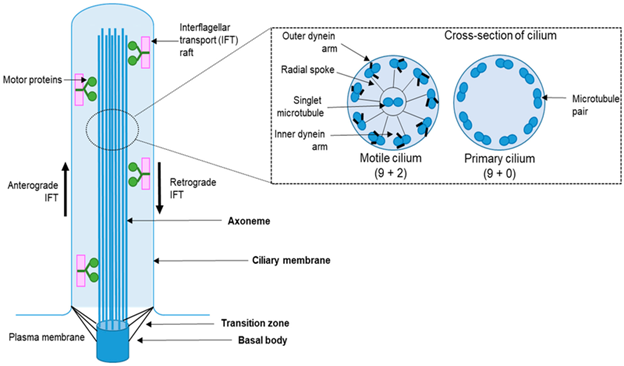
Eukaryotic cilium, showing the axoneme arrangement of motile and non-motile (primary) cilia

Cilia are microscopic, hair-like structures that extend from the surface of nearly all mammalian cells. They are composed of complex protein structures and play a crucial role in various cellular functions, including movement and signal transduction.

Cilia are categorized into two main structural subtypes based on the organization of their microtubule axoneme: motile and non-motile (primary) cilia. Motile cilia are typically structured in a 9+2 arrangement, consisting of nine outer microtubule doublets surrounding a central pair of microtubules. This structure is specialized for movement, enabling functions such as fluid transport across epithelial surfaces, cell motility, and propulsion of spermatozoa.

In contrast, primary (non-motile) cilia display a 9+0 arrangement, where nine outer microtubule doublets are present without a central pair. Rather than generating movement, these cilia serve as cellular antennae, playing crucial roles in sensory perception, intracellular signaling, and regulation of developmental pathways, including organogenesis. Primary cilia function mainly as sensory organelles, involved in signal transduction and the maintenance of cellular homeostasis.

This structural distinction is fundamental to understanding the diverse biological functions and pathologies associated with ciliopathies.

== Genetics ==
Ciliopathies are genetically heterogeneous disorders that arise due to mutations in genes associated with the structure and function of cilia. A unique feature of these conditions is that the same gene can be involved in different diseases, and that different genes can lead to similar phenotypes. For example, mutations in certain genes have been linked to both Meckel–Gruber syndrome and Bardet–Biedl syndrome, and in some patients carrying mutations in both, combined phenotypes have been observed that do not occur in either condition alone.

Because ciliopathy genes often function within interconnected developmental pathways, systems biologists are seeking to define gene modules—co-regulated sets of genes that drive specific biological outcomes.

Furthermore, significant phenotypic overlap has been documented among different ciliopathies, largely due to the fact that many of the involved genes affect primary cilia function. As a result, the same mutation can lead to different clinical presentations, suggesting that genetic modifiers (i.e., other genes that influence disease expression) play an important role in determining disease severity and organ involvement. As of 2017, 187 genes had been confirmed to be directly associated with ciliopathies, with an additional 241 candidate genes still under investigation.

This genetic complexity makes molecular diagnosis both challenging and essential. For inherited ciliopathies such as autosomal dominant and autosomal recessive polycystic kidney disease (ADPKD and ARPKD), traditional methods like linkage analysis and targeted mutation screening have been used. Modern approaches such as gene panels, exome sequencing, and whole genome sequencing are increasingly replacing traditional methods, as they enable the identification of both known and rare mutations and can detect heterozygous carriers in recessive disorders. These methods allow for broader detection of both common and rare mutations and are particularly useful for identifying heterozygous carriers in recessive ciliopathies. By providing a more comprehensive genetic profile, these tools enhance diagnostic precision and support the identification of novel ciliopathy-associated genes.

A classic example of a genetically defined ciliopathy is ADPKD, which is caused by mutations in PKD1 and PKD2, encoding polycystin-1 and -2, respectively. These proteins are essential for the mechanosensory function of cilia in the renal epithelium. Mutations result in defective signaling and cyst formation, which can eventually lead to kidney failure.

== List of ciliopathies ==
=== Known ciliopathies ===
Condition	OMIM	Gene(s)	Notes
Alström syndrome	203800	ALMS1	
Asphyxiating thoracic dysplasia (Jeune syndrome)	208500	DYNC2H1, IFT80, IFT140, TTC21B, WDR19, WDR35	
Bardet–Biedl syndrome	209900	ARL6, BBS1, BBS2, BBS4, BBS5, BBS7, BBS9, BBS10, BBS12, MKKS, MKS1, MKS3, SDCCAG8, TTC8, TRIM32, WDPCP	
Ellis–van Creveld syndrome	225500	EVC, EVC2	
Joubert syndrome	213300	AHI1, ATXN10, ARL13B, BRCC3, CC2D2A, CEP41, CEP290, CPLANE1, INPP5E, KIF7, NPHP1, NPHP3, RPGRIP1L, TCTN1, TCTN2, TMEM67, TMEM138, TMEM216, TMEM237	
Leber congenital amaurosis	204000	GUCY2D, RPE65	
McKusick–Kaufman syndrome	236700	MKKS	
Meckel–Gruber syndrome	249000	B9D1, B9D2, CC2D2A, CEP290, MKS1-6, MKKS, NPHP3, RPGRIP1L, TCTN2, TMEM67, TMEM216	
Nephronophthisis	256100	ALMS1, ATXN10, CEP290, GLIS2, IFT139, INVS, IQCB1, NEK8, NPHP1-11, RPGRIP1L, TCTN2, TTC21B, TTC8, WDR19, XPNPEP3	
Orofaciodigital syndrome 1	311200	OFD1	
Polycystic kidney disease (ADPKD and ARPKD)	173900	PKD1, PKD2, PKHD1	
Primary ciliary dyskinesia (Kartagener syndrome)	244400	DNAI1, DNAH5, TXNDC3, DNAH11, DNAI2, KTU, RSPH4A, RSPH9, LRRC50	
Senior–Løken syndrome	266900	NPHP1, NPHP4, IQCB1, CEP290, SDCCAG8	
Sensenbrenner syndrome (cranioectodermal dysplasia)	218330	IFT122	
Short rib–polydactyly syndrome	613091	DYNC2H1	
?	?	IFT88	Novel form of congenital anosmia, reported in 2012

=== Likely ciliopathies ===
Condition	OMIM	Gene(s)	Notes
Acrocallosal syndrome	200990	KIF7, GLI3	
Acromelic frontonasal dysostosis	603671	ZSWIM6	
Arima syndrome	243910		
Biemond syndrome	113400		
COACH syndrome	216360	TMEM67, CC2D2A, RPGRIP1L	
Conorenal syndrome	266920		
Greig cephalopolysyndactyly syndrome	175700	GLI3	
Hydrolethalus syndrome	236680	HYLS1	
Johanson–Blizzard syndrome	243800	UBR1	
Mohr syndrome (oral-facial-digital syndrome type 2)	252100		
Neu–Laxova syndrome	256520	PHGDH, PSAT1, PSPH	
Opitz G/BBB syndrome	300000	MID1	
Pallister–Hall syndrome	146510	GLI3	
Papillorenal syndrome	120330	PAX2	
Renal–hepatic–pancreatic dysplasia	208540	NPHP3	
Varadi–Papp syndrome (oral-facial-digital syndrome type 6)	277170		

=== Possible ciliopathies ===
Condition	OMIM	Gene(s)	Notes
Acrofacial dysostosis			
Acrofrontofacionasal dysostosis 2	239710		
Adams–Oliver syndrome	100300	ARHGAP31, DOCK6, RBPJ, EOGT, NOTCH1, DLL4	
Asplenia with cardiovascular anomalies (Ivemark syndrome)	208530		
Autosomal recessive spastic paraplegia			
Barakat syndrome (HDR syndrome)	146255	GATA3	
Basal cell nevus syndrome	109400	PTCH1, PTCH2, SUFU	
Branchio‐oculo‐facial syndrome	113620	TFAP2A	
C syndrome (Opitz trigonocephaly)	211750	CD96	
Carpenter syndrome	201000	RAB23	
Cephaloskeletal dysplasia (microcephalic osteodysplastic primordial dwarfism type 1)	210710	RNU4ATAC	
Cerebrofaciothoracic dysplasia	213980	TMCO1	
Cerebrofrontofacial syndrome (Baraitser–Winter syndrome)	243310	ACTB	
Cerebrooculonasal syndrome	605627		
Autosomal recessive spastic ataxia of Charlevoix-Saguenay	270550	SACS	
Chondrodysplasia punctata 2	302960	EBP	
Choroideremia	303100	CHM	
Chudley–McCullough syndrome	604213	GPSM2	
C‐like syndrome	605039	ASXL1	
Coffin–Siris syndrome	135900	ARID1B, SOX11, ARID2	
Cohen syndrome	216550	VPS13B	
Craniofrontonasal dysplasia	304110	EFNB1	
Dysgnathia complex	202650		
Ectrodactyly–ectodermal dysplasia–cleft syndrome type 1	129900		
Endocrine–cerebroosteodysplasia syndrome	612651	ICK	
Focal dermal hypoplasia	305600	PORCN	
Frontonasal dysplasia	136760	ALX3, ALX4, ALX1	
Fryns microphthalmia syndrome	600776		
Fryns syndrome	229850		
Genitopatellar syndrome	606170	KAT6B	
Hemifacial microsomia	164210		
Hypothalamic hamartomas	241800		
Johnson neuroectodermal syndrome	147770		
Juvenile myoclonic epilepsy	254770		
Kabuki syndrome	147920	KMT2D, KDM6A	
Kallmann syndrome	308700	ANOS1	
Lenz–Majewski hyperostotic dwarfism	151050	PTDSS1	
Lissencephaly 3	611603	TUBA1A	
Marden–Walker syndrome	248700	PIEZO2	
MASA syndrome	303350	L1CAM	
Microhydranencephaly	605013	NDE1	
Mowat–Wilson syndrome	235730	ZEB2	
NDH syndrome	610199	GLIS3	
Oculoauriculofrontonasal syndrome	601452		
Oculocerebrocutaneous syndrome	164180		
Oculodentodigital dysplasia	164200	GJA1	
Optiz–Kaveggia syndrome	305450	MED12	
Otopalatodigital syndrome 2	304120	FLNA	
Periventricular heterotopia X‐linked	300049	FLNA	
Perlman syndrome	267000	DIS3L2	
Pitt–Hopkins syndrome	610954	TCF4	
Polycystic liver disease	174050		
Proteus syndrome	176920	AKT1	
Pseudotrisomy 13	264480		
Retinal cone dystrophy 1	180020		
Some forms of retinitis pigmentosa	268000		
Robinow syndrome	268310	ROR2	
Rubinstein–Taybi syndrome	180849	CREBBP	
Sakoda complex	610871		
Schinzel–Giedion syndrome	269150	SETBP1	
Split-hand/foot malformation 3	246560		
Spondyloepiphyseal dysplasia congenita	183900	COL2A1	
Thanatophoric dysplasia	187600	FGFR3	
Townes–Brocks syndrome	107480	SALL1, DACT1	
Tuberous sclerosis	191100	TSC1, TSC2	
VATER association	192350		
Ven den Ende–Gupta syndrome	600920	SCARF2	
Visceral heterotaxy	606325		
Walker–Warburg syndrome	236670		
Warburg Micro syndrome	615663	RAB3GAP1	
X‐linked congenital hydrocephalus	307000	L1CAM	
X‐linked lissencephaly	300067	DCX	
Young–Simpson syndrome	603736	KAT6B	

== History ==
The discovery of cilia marked a pivotal moment in biological science. In the 1670s, Dutch microscopist Antonie van Leeuwenhoek described microscopic "animalcules" in rainwater, observing tiny, moving projections on their surfaces—structures that are now recognized as cilia. This was the first recorded observation of cellular appendages involved in locomotion and environmental sensing.

Despite early recognition, the functional importance of cilia remained underappreciated for centuries. Non-motile, or primary cilia, were first described in 1898, but were largely dismissed as vestigial structures without biological significance. It was not until the advent of advanced microscopy and molecular genetics in the late 20th and early 21st centuries that the essential roles of cilia in development and disease became clear. Today, primary cilia are understood as sensory organelles that coordinate diverse signaling pathways such as Hedgehog and Wnt, and are critical for tissue patterning, cellular differentiation, and organ development. Cilia function as cellular "antennae," detecting mechanical, chemical, and thermal cues from the environment.

The modern era of ciliopathy research has been driven by advances in mammalian genetics. These have enabled the identification of mutations in cilia-related genes that underlie a wide spectrum of genetic disorders, now collectively referred to as ciliopathies. These include autosomal dominant and recessive polycystic kidney disease, nephronophthisis, Bardet–Biedl syndrome, Joubert syndrome, and others. The overlapping phenotypes of these diseases reflect the shared molecular architecture of cilia and their conserved roles across organ systems. Foundational work in embryology by scientists such as Karl Ernst von Baer laid the conceptual groundwork for modern developmental biology. Although von Baer did not explicitly describe cilia, his meticulous observations of embryonic tissues likely included ciliated structures. His legacy continues to influence current research into the roles of cilia in early development, particularly in establishing left-right asymmetry and proper organ positioning.
