= Joubert syndrome =

Autosomal recessive genetic disorder

- Other names: CPD IV
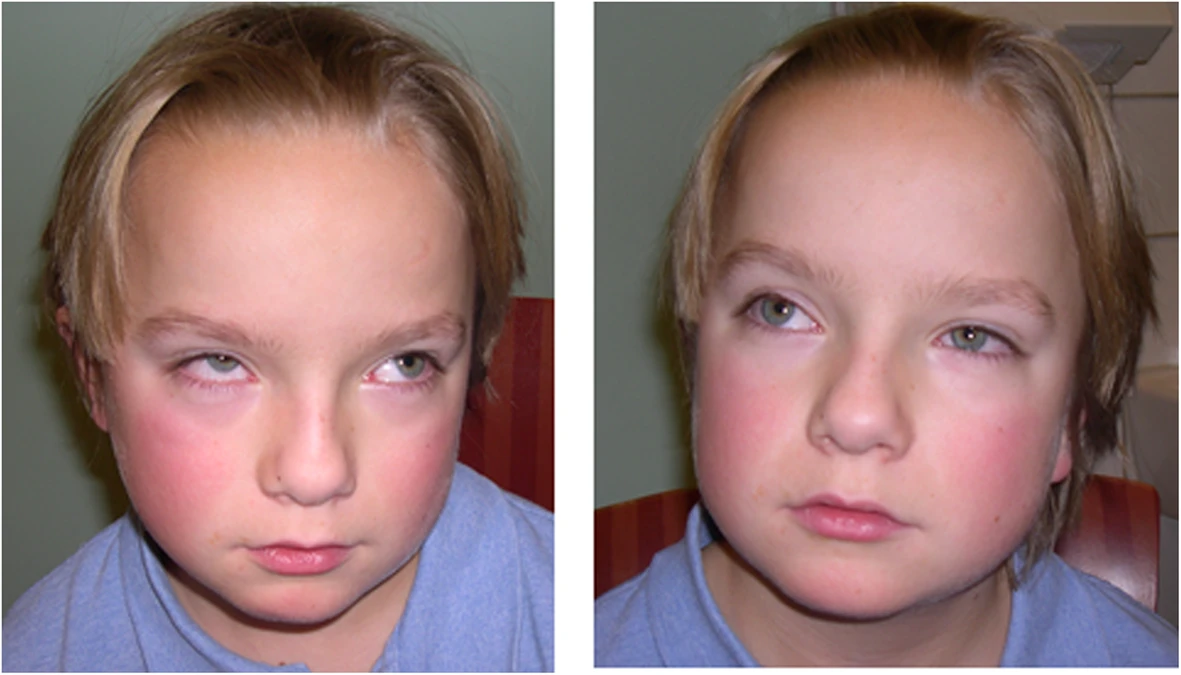
- Photo of a person with Joubert syndrome, with hypertelorism, ptosis, arched eyebrows, and a broad forehead. Also, Duane syndrome can be seen.
- Specialty: Medical genetics
- Differential diagnosis: Dandy–Walker malformation, ataxia with oculomotor apraxia, 3C syndrome, Meckel–Gruber syndromeOpitz C syndrome
- Frequency: Between 1:80,000 and 1:100,000

Joubert syndrome is a rare autosomal recessive genetic disorder that affects the cerebellum, an area of the brain that controls balance and coordination.

Joubert syndrome is one of the many genetic syndromes associated with syndromic retinitis pigmentosa. The syndrome was first identified in 1969 by pediatric neurologist Marie Joubert in Montreal, Quebec, Canada, while working at the Montreal Neurological Institute and McGill University.

== Signs and symptoms ==
Most of the signs and symptoms of Joubert syndrome appear very early in infancy with most children showing delays in gross motor milestones. Although other signs and symptoms vary widely from individual to individual, they generally fall under the hallmark of cerebellum involvement or in this case, lack thereof. Consequently, the most common features include ataxia (lack of muscle control), hyperpnea (abnormal breathing patterns), sleep apnea, abnormal eye and tongue movements, and hypotonia in early childhood. Other malformations such as polydactyly (extra fingers and toes), cleft lip or palate, tongue abnormalities, and seizures may also occur. Developmental delays, including cognitive, are always present to some degree. Severe forms have been noted to include hypoplasia of the corpus callosum.

Those with this syndrome often exhibit specific facial features such as a broad forehead, arched eyebrows, ptosis (droopy eyelids), hypertelorism (widely spaced eyes), low-set ears, and a triangle shaped mouth. Additionally, this disease can include a broad range of other abnormalities in other organ systems such as retinal dystrophy, kidney diseases, liver diseases, skeletal deformities, and endocrine (hormonal) problems.

== Genetics ==
Several mutations have been identified in individuals with Joubert syndrome (JBTS) which allowed for classification of the disorder into subtypes.

This disorder can be caused by mutations in more than 30 genes within genetic makeup. The primary cilia play an important role in the structure and function of cells. When primary cilia are mutated and defective, it can cause various genetic disorders among individuals. This mutation of primary cilia can disrupt significant signaling pathways during the development of the fetus.

Mutations in these various genes are known to cause around 60-90% of Joubert Syndrome cases. In the remaining cases, the cause is unknown if not linked to a mutation of known genes.

Type	OMIM	Gene	Locus	Inheritance	Remarks
JBTS1	213300	INPP5E	9q34.3	Autosomal recessive	Also known as Cerebellooculorenal syndrome 1 (CORS1)
JBTS2	608091	TMEM216	11q12.2	Autosomal recessive	Also known as Cerebellooculorenal syndrome 2 (CORS2)
JBTS3	608629	AHI1	6q23.3	Autosomal recessive	
JBTS4	609583	NPHP1	2q13		
JBTS5	610188	CEP290	12q21.32	Autosomal recessive	
JBTS6	610688	TMEM67	8q22.1	Autosomal recessive	
JBTS7	611560	RPGRIP1L	16q12.2		
JBTS8	612291	ARL13B	3q11.1		
JBTS9	612285	CC2D2A	4p15.32	Autosomal recessive	
JBTS10	300804	OFD1	Xp22.2	X-linked recessive	
JBTS11	613820*	TTC21B	2q24.3		
JBTS12	200990*	KIF7	15q26.1		Overlapping phenotype with acrocallosal syndrome
JBTS13	614173	TCTN1	12q24.11		
JBTS14	614424	TMEM237	2q33.1	Autosomal recessive	
JBTS15	614464	CEP41	7q32.2	Autosomal recessive	
JBTS16	614465	TMEM138	11q12.2	Autosomal recessive	
JBTS17	614615	CPLANE1	5p13.2		
JBTS18	614815	TCTN3	10q24.1		
JBTS19	614844*	ZNF423	16q12.1	Autosomal dominant	
JBTS20	614970	TMEM231	16q23.1	Autosomal recessive	
JBTS21	615636	CSPP1	8q13.2	Autosomal recessive	
JBTS30	617622	ARMC9	2q37.1	Autosomal recessive	
JBTS36	618763	FAM149B1	10q22.2	Autosomal recessive	
JBTS40	619582	IFT74	9p21.2	Autosomal recessive	

== Diagnosis ==
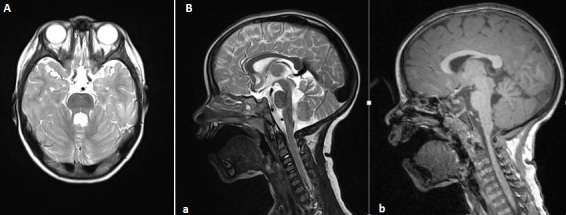
(A) MRI Brain, axial T2 sequence showing enlarged superior cerebellar peduncles and vermian hypoplasia resulting in characteristic "molar tooth" appearance; (B) MRI Brain, sagittal T2 (a) and T1 (b) sequences showing vermian hypoplasia, predominantly at the superior aspect

The disorder is characterized by the absence or underdevelopment of the cerebellar vermis and a malformed brain stem (molar tooth sign), both of which can be visualized on a transverse view of the head MRI scan. Together with this sign, the diagnosis is based on the physical symptoms and genetic testing for mutations. If the gene mutations have been identified in a family member, prenatal or carrier diagnosis can be pursued.

Joubert Syndrome is known to affect 1 in 80,000-100,000 newborns. Due to the variety of genes this disorder involves, it is likely to be underdiagnosed. It is commonly found in Ashkenazi Jewish, French-Canadians, and Hutterite ethnic populations. Most cases of Joubert syndrome are autosomal recessive; in these cases, both parents are either carriers or affected. Rarely, Joubert syndrome is inherited in an X-linked recessive pattern. In these cases, males are more commonly affected because they must have one X chromosome mutated, while affected females must have mutated genes on both X chromosomes.

== Treatment ==
Treatment for Joubert syndrome is symptomatic and supportive. Infants with abnormal breathing patterns should be monitored. The syndrome is associated with progressive worsening of the kidneys, the liver, and the eyes and thus requires regular monitoring.

Delays in gross motor skills, fine motor skills, and speech development are seen in almost all individuals with Joubert syndrome. Delays can be due to low muscle tone as well as impaired motor coordination. Some children have also been noted to have visual impairment due to abnormal eye movements. Developmental delays are usually treated with physical therapy, occupational therapy, and speech therapy interventions. Most children diagnosed with Joubert syndrome can achieve standard milestones, although often at a much later age.

== Prognosis ==
In a sample of 19 children, a 1997 study found that 3 died before the age of 3, and 2 never learned to walk. The children had various levels of delayed development with developmental quotients from 60 to 85.

== Research ==
Research has revealed that a number of genetic disorders, not previously thought to be related, may indeed be related as to their root cause. Joubert syndrome is one such disease. It is a member of an emerging class of diseases called ciliopathies.

The underlying cause of the ciliopathies may be a dysfunctional molecular mechanism in the primary cilia structures of the cell, organelles which are present in many cellular types throughout the human body. The cilia defects adversely affect "numerous critical developmental signaling pathways" essential to cellular development and thus offer a plausible hypothesis for the often multi-symptom nature of a large set of syndromes and diseases.

Currently recognized ciliopathies include Joubert syndrome, primary ciliary dyskinesia (also known as Kartagener Syndrome), Bardet–Biedl syndrome, polycystic kidney disease and polycystic liver disease, nephronophthisis, Alström syndrome, Meckel–Gruber syndrome and some forms of retinal degeneration.

Joubert syndrome type 2 is disproportionately frequent among people of Jewish descent.
