= Senior–Løken syndrome =

Congenital eye disorder

- Other names: Renal dysplasia-retinal aplasia syndrome
- Senior–Løken syndrome is an autosomal recessive inherited condition
- Specialty: Medical genetics
- Frequency: 0.0005%

Senior–Løken syndrome is a congenital eye disorder, first characterized in 1961. It is a rare, ciliopathic, autosomal recessive disorder characterized by juvenile nephronophthis and progressive eye disease.

== Genetics ==
Genes involved include:

Type	OMIM	Genes
SLSN1	266900	NPHP1
SLSN3	606995	unknown
SLSN4	606996	NPHP4
SLSN5	609254	NPHP5/IQCB1
SLSN6	610189	NPHP6/CEP290
SLSN7	613615	SDCCAG8

== Pathophysiology ==
The cause of Senior–Løken syndrome type 5 has been identified to mutation in the NPHP1 gene which adversely affects the protein formation mechanism of the cilia.

=== Relation to other rare genetic disorders ===
Recent findings in genetic research have suggested that a large number of genetic disorders, both genetic syndromes and genetic diseases, that were not previously identified in the medical literature as related, may be, in fact, highly related in the genetypical root cause of the widely varying, phenotypically-observed disorders. Such diseases are becoming known as ciliopathies. Known ciliopathies include primary ciliary dyskinesia, Bardet–Biedl syndrome, polycystic kidney and liver disease, nephronophthisis, Alström syndrome, Meckel–Gruber syndrome and some forms of retinal degeneration.
