= Exencephaly =

Birth defect where brain is outside the skull

Exencephaly is a type of cephalic disorder wherein the brain is located outside of the skull. This condition is usually found in embryos as an early stage of anencephaly. As an exencephalic pregnancy progresses, the neural tissue gradually degenerates.

The prognosis for infants born with exencephaly is extremely poor. It is rare to find an infant born with exencephaly, as most cases that are not early stages of anencephaly are usually stillborn. Those infants who are born with the condition usually die within hours or minutes. The disorder is caused by the failure of cranial neuropore to properly fuse between the 3rd and 4th week post conception. Because of this, the calvarium does not develop / fuse properly and the brain extrudes from the cranium.

== Pathophysiology ==
Until recently, the medical literature did not indicate a connection among many genetic disorders, both genetic syndromes and genetic diseases, that are now being found to be related. As a result of new genetic research, some of these are, in fact, highly related in their root cause despite the widely varying set of medical symptoms that are clinically visible in the disorders. Exencephaly is one disease that has recently been identified as part of an emerging class of diseases called ciliopathies. The underlying cause may be a dysfunctional molecular mechanism in the primary cilia structures of the cell, organelles which are present in many cell types throughout the human body. The cilia defects adversely affect "numerous critical developmental signaling pathways" essential to cellular development and thus offer a plausible hypothesis for the often multi-symptom nature of a large set of syndromes and diseases. Known ciliopathies include primary ciliary dyskinesia, Bardet–Biedl syndrome, polycystic kidney and liver disease, nephronophthisis, Alström syndrome, Meckel–Gruber syndrome and some forms of retinal degeneration.

== See also ==
- Anencephaly
- Acrania
