= XPNPEP3 =

Protein-coding gene in humans

Identifiers
- Aliases: XPNPEP3, APP3, NPHPL1, ICP55, X-prolyl aminopeptidase 3, mitochondrial, X-prolyl aminopeptidase 3
- External IDs: OMIM: 613553; MGI: 2445217; GeneCards: XPNPEP3
Enzyme activity
| EC # | BRENDA | ExPASy | KEGG | MetaCyc |
|---|---|---|---|---|
| 3.4.11.9 | ↗ | ↗ | ↗ | ↗ |

Gene location (Human)
| Chr. | Chromosome 22 (human) |
| Band | 22q13.2 | Start | 40,857,077 bp |
| Band | 22q13.2 | End | 40,932,815 bp |

Gene location (Mouse)
| Chr. | Chromosome 15 (mouse) |
| Band | 15|15 E1 | Start | 81,284,339 bp |
| Band | 15|15 E1 | End | 81,341,683 bp |
RNA expression pattern
| Bgee | Human / Mouse (ortholog); Top expressed in: buccal mucosa cell; bronchial epithelial cell; sperm; right testis; left testis; testicle; caput epididymis; tibia; muscle of thigh; liver / Top expressed in: hand; tail of embryo; genital tubercle; Rostral migratory stream; otolith organ; brown adipose tissue; utricle; spermatocyte; zygote; left lobe of liver; More reference expression data |
| BioGPS | n/a |
Gene ontology
| Molecular function | peptidase activity; aminopeptidase activity; hydrolase activity; metallopeptidase activity; metal ion binding; protein binding; manganese ion binding; protein homodimerization activity; metalloaminopeptidase activity |
| Cellular component | mitochondrion; cytoplasm |
| Biological process | protein processing; glomerular filtration; proteolysis |
Sources:Amigo / QuickGO
Orthologs
| Databases | NCBI: entry; OMA: entry |
| Species | Human | Mouse |
| Entrez | 63929 | 321003 |
| Ensembl | ENSG00000196236 | ENSMUSG00000022401 |
| UniProt | Q9NQH7 | B7ZMP1 |
| RefSeq (mRNA) | NM_022098; NM_001204827 | NM_177310; NM_001347075 |
| RefSeq (protein) | NP_001191756; NP_071381 | NP_001334004; NP_796284 |
| Location (UCSC) | Chr 22: 40.86 – 40.93 Mb | Chr 15: 81.28 – 81.34 Mb |
| PubMed search |
- Wikidata
| View/Edit Human | View/Edit Mouse |

Xaa-Pro aminopeptidase 3, also known as aminopeptidase P3, is an enzyme that in humans is encoded by the XPNPEP3 gene. XPNPEP3 localizes to mitochondria in renal cells and to kidney tubules in a cell type-specific pattern. Mutations in XPNPEP3 gene have been identified as a cause of a nephronophthisis-like disease.

== Structure ==
=== Gene ===
The XPNPEP3 gene is located at chromosome 22q13.2, consisting of 12 exons. Two splice variants of XPNPEP3, APP3m and APP3c, exist in mitochondria and cytosol, respectively.

=== Protein ===
APP3m has an N-terminal mitochondrial-targeting sequence (MTS) domain importing APP3m into mitochondria, where the domain is removed proteolytically and APP3m functions as a 51-kDa mature protein. By contrast, APP3c, lacks the MTS and is expressed in the cytosol. Arginine in MTS is required for mitochondrial transport.

== Function ==
XPNPEP3 belongs to a family of X-pro-aminopeptidases (EC 3.4.11.9) that utilize a metal cofactor and remove the N-terminal amino acid from peptides with a proline residue in the penultimate position. It has been found that upon tumor necrosis factor stimulation, XPNPEP3 is released from mitochondria. XPNPEP3 is a new member of the TNF-TNFR2 signaling complex and plays a role in the transduction mechanism of TNFR2 signal which activates both JNK1 and JNK2 pathways. It is also observed that cell death increases upon downregulation of XPNPEP3, suggesting XPNPEP3 exerts an anti-apoptotic function. Deletion of icp55, the S. cerevisiae ortholog of XPNPEP3, increases the proteolytic rate of its substrates through a protein degradation pathway characterized by the N-end rule.

== Clinical significance ==
Mutations in the XPNPEP3 gene are associated with ciliopathy. Recessive mutations in XPNPEP3 gene has been identified as a cause of a nephronophthisis-like disease, characterized by renal interstitial infiltration with fibrosis, tubular atrophy with basement membrane disruption, and cyst development at the corticomedullary renal border. Phenotypic variability might be ascribed to different degrees of loss of function for the 2 different homozygous XPNPEP3 alleles. The ciliary phenotypes unmasked by loss of XPNPEP3 might arise from the loss of XPNPEP3-dependent processing of ciliary proteins.

== Interactions ==
- NPHP6/CEP290
- TNF
