= RPGRIP1L =

Protein-coding gene found in humans

Identifiers
- Aliases: RPGRIP1L, CORS3, FTM, JBTS7, MKS5, NPHP8, PPP1R134, RPGRIP1 like, COACH3
- External IDs: OMIM: 610937; MGI: 1920563; GeneCards: RPGRIP1L
Available structures
PDB	Ortholog search: PDBe RCSB
PDB	List of PDB id codes 2YRB

Gene location (Human)
Chr.	Chromosome 16 (human)
Band	16q12.2	Start	53,598,153 bp
Band	16q12.2	End	53,703,938 bp

Gene location (Mouse)
Chr.	Chromosome 8 (mouse)
Band	8 C5|8 44.29 cM	Start	91,943,658 bp
Band	8 C5|8 44.29 cM	End	92,039,890 bp
RNA expression pattern
Bgee	Human / Mouse (ortholog); Top expressed in: bronchial epithelial cell; gonad; testicle; ventricular zone; right testis; left testis; right uterine tube; Achilles tendon; stromal cell of endometrium; ganglionic eminence / Top expressed in: zygote; secondary oocyte; primary oocyte; genital tubercle; spermatid; testicle; tail of embryo; ovary; spermatocyte; visual cortex; More reference expression data
BioGPS	n/a
Gene ontology
Molecular function	thromboxane A2 receptor binding; protein binding; host cell surface receptor binding
Cellular component	cytoplasm; centrosome; cell projection; cell-cell junction; bicellular tight junction; cilium; microtubule organizing center; cell junction; axoneme; cytoskeleton; nucleoplasm; cytosol; plasma membrane; ciliary transition zone; ciliary basal body; axonemal microtubule; photoreceptor connecting cilium; ciliary rootlet; viral envelope
Biological process	establishment of planar polarity; negative regulation of G protein-coupled receptor signaling pathway; ciliary basal body-plasma membrane docking; developmental process; in utero embryonic development; kidney development; liver development; establishment or maintenance of cell polarity; determination of left/right symmetry; brain development; regulation of smoothened signaling pathway; neural tube patterning; telencephalon development; cerebellum development; lateral ventricle development; olfactory bulb development; corpus callosum development; limb morphogenesis; embryonic forelimb morphogenesis; embryonic hindlimb morphogenesis; camera-type eye development; nose development; pericardium development; cilium assembly; head development; cochlea development; non-motile cilium assembly
Sources:Amigo / QuickGO
Orthologs
Databases	NCBI: entry; OMA: entry
Species	Human	Mouse
Entrez	23322	244585
Ensembl	ENSG00000103494	ENSMUSG00000033282
UniProt	Q68CZ1	Q8CG73
RefSeq (mRNA)	NM_001127897; NM_001308334; NM_015272; NM_001328422; NM_001328423 NM_001330538	NM_173431
RefSeq (protein)	NP_001121369; NP_001295263; NP_001315351; NP_001315352; NP_001317467 NP_056087; NP_001295263.1	NP_775607
Location (UCSC)	Chr 16: 53.6 – 53.7 Mb	Chr 8: 91.94 – 92.04 Mb
PubMed search
- Wikidata
View/Edit Human	View/Edit Mouse

Protein fantom, also called RPGRIP1-like protein, is a protein that in humans is encoded by the RPGRIP1L gene.

== Function ==
The protein encoded by this gene is localized to primary cilia and centrosomes in ciliated human epithelial kidney cells and retinal pigment epithelial cells . RPGRIP1L colocalized at the basal body-centrosome complex with the proteins NPHP4, NPHP6, and TUBG1. Also, it can interact with myosin Va.

== Clinical significance ==
Mutations in the RPGRIP1L gene are associated with Joubert syndrome and Meckel syndrome which belong to a group of developmental autosomal recessive disorders that are associated with cilium dysfunction. Mutations in this gene are also associated with nephronophthisis. Copy number variation affecting the gene was associated with schizophrenia in one study.

A genetic variation within the RPGRIP1L gene, rs3213758, is associated with increased BMI. Genetic variations strongly associated with obesity within the FTO gene have also been implicated in the control of RPGRIP1L expression. Mice with decreased expression of RPGRIP1L are fatter, eat more, have diminished sensitivity to the hormone leptin that normally reduces food intake, and display altered morphology of the brain center that regulates feeding. Similarly, cells derived from Joubert patients with RPGRIP1L mutations have decreased leptin sensitivity, and neurons important for food intake segregating for obesity-risk variations at the FTO locus have decreased RPGRIP1L expression and diminished outgrowth. These studies suggest that RPGRIP1L is a gene important in human obesity.
