= Conorenal syndrome =

- Other names: Mainzer-Saldino syndrome or Saldino-Mainzer disease
- Specialty: Medical genetics

Conorenal syndrome is a collection of medical conditions that seem to have a common genetic cause.

== Genetics ==
The exact gene loci has not been characterized.

- NPHP3: Olbrich, et al., found mutations in the NPHP3 gene that cause nepnroonophthisis and a version of Retinitis Pigmentosa called Lebers Congenital Amaurosis (Senior Loken Syndrome) and hepatic syndrome. Their research leads them to conclude "Our findings suggest that the NPHP genes (NPHP1, NPHP3, NPHP4) involved in the pathogenesis of recessive cystic kidney disease also belong to a common pathway in the primary cilium of kidney cells."
- NPHP5: Otto, et al. found through positional cloning that NPHP5 (IQCB1) is the most frequent cause of a disease very similar to Conorenal Syndrome (renal-retinal Senior-Loken Syndrome).

== Mechanism ==
While it is not fully characterized as such, yet, conorenal syndrome seems to be an uncharacterized form of ciliopathy. A ciliopathy is a disease that affects the cilia (sensing cells within the body).

The link to ciliar problems as a cause for Nephronopthisis and similar Kidney diseases is relatively new. Watnick and Germino note that NPHP1 and NPHP4 encode for the proteins nephrocystin and nephrocystin-4 (nephroretinin). These have been shown to interact in a series of cell-cell and cell-matrix signaling proteins. NPHP2 has been also shown to have possible links to the function of the primary renal cilium and to control of the cell cycle (Otto). Otto further found that nephrocystin, inversin (INVS) and nephroretinin colocalize in the primary cilia of cultured renal epithelia cells. One interesting connection is that primary cilia in renal cells may perform a sensing function which maintains the renal tubules. The loss of cystoproteins may lead to dysregulated growth.

The link to a ciliary dysfunction in the Retinal degenerative diseases also comes from Otto. Like the described Kidney diseases, Retinitis Pigmentosa is a disease where the ciliar cells (Rods and Cones) fail to thrive. In a study of patients with a disease similar to Conorenal (renal-retinal Senior-Loken) the authors state "We show that nephrocystin-5, RPGR and calmodulin can be coimmniprecipitated from retinal extracts, and that these proteins localize to connecting cilia of photoreceptors and to primary cilia of renal epithelial cells. Our studies emphasize the central role of ciliary dysfunction in the pathogenesis of renal-retinal Senior Loken Syndrome." In other words, there is a common link between certain kidney diseases and some forms of RP and it is through the something related to a problem in the cilia cells. This may be a problem in the cells themselves, or with something that keeps them alive and healthy.

== Outcomes ==
When originally characterized by Giedion, there was a relatively high mortality rate due to untreated kidney failure (end stage kidney disease - ESKD). The remarkable improvements in kidney transplantation have reduced the mortality of Conorenal Syndrome substantially if not eliminated it entirely. Most diagnosis of the disease occurs when children present with kidney failure – usually between the ages of 10 and 14. There is no known cure for the syndrome and management of the syndrome is supportive.

== History ==
The syndrome was originally characterized during 1970 by Mainzer, et al., in a paper published in the American Journal of Medicine. In 1979, Giedion named the syndrome "conorenal syndrome" after a study of eight children. The children had chronic kidney failure and the epiphyses of their fingers were cone-shaped and protruded into the metaphysis; some also had retinitis pigmentosa (also called RP, a progressive degeneration of the retina which affects night vision and peripheral vision) or ataxia (an inability to coordinate muscular movements). In 1995, a group led by Mendley studied two siblings and determined that renal histopathologic (features that can be identified in the laboratory) and clinical features of a primarily glomerular disorder (a kidney disorder involving the glomeruli, or clusters of blood vessels that act as filters in the kidney) were features of the syndrome. A recent article by Beals and Weleber (2007) also noted that a majority of patients also have small capital femoral epiphyses (the very tops of the femur where it hits the hip socket ) and/or mild abnormalities of the promixal femoral metaphysis.
