= Methyl-CpG binding domain protein 5 =

Protein-coding gene in the species Homo sapiens

MBD5

Identifiers
- Aliases: MBD5, MRD1, methyl-CpG binding domain protein 5
- External IDs: OMIM: 611472; MGI: 2138934; GeneCards: MBD5

Gene location (Human)
Chr.	Chromosome 2 (human)
Band	2q23.1	Start	148,021,011 bp
Band	2q23.1	End	148,516,971 bp

Gene location (Mouse)
Chr.	Chromosome 2 (mouse)
Band	2|2 C1.1	Start	48,949,508 bp
Band	2|2 C1.1	End	49,325,405 bp
RNA expression pattern
Bgee	Human / Mouse (ortholog); Top expressed in: Achilles tendon; sural nerve; epithelium of colon; muscle layer of sigmoid colon; corpus callosum; left testis; stromal cell of endometrium; right testis; granulocyte; left ovary / Top expressed in: zygote; tail of embryo; genital tubercle; Rostral migratory stream; dentate gyrus of hippocampal formation granule cell; secondary oocyte; lateral septal nucleus; neural layer of retina; otolith organ; nucleus accumbens; More reference expression data
BioGPS	n/a
Gene ontology
Molecular function	DNA binding; chromatin binding
Cellular component	chromocenter; extracellular exosome; nucleus; chromosome; nucleoplasm; midbody
Biological process	positive regulation of growth hormone receptor signaling pathway; glucose homeostasis; nervous system development; regulation of multicellular organism growth; protein deubiquitination; behavior; regulation of behavior
Sources:Amigo / QuickGO
Orthologs
Databases	NCBI: entry; OMA: entry
Species	Human	Mouse
Entrez	55777	109241
Ensembl	ENSG00000204406	ENSMUSG00000036792
UniProt	Q9P267	B1AYB6
RefSeq (mRNA)	NM_018328	NM_001290656; NM_029924
RefSeq (protein)	NP_060798; NP_001365049	NP_001277585; NP_084200
Location (UCSC)	Chr 2: 148.02 – 148.52 Mb	Chr 2: 48.95 – 49.33 Mb
PubMed search
- Wikidata
View/Edit Human	View/Edit Mouse

Methyl-CpG binding domain protein 5 is a protein that in humans is encoded by the MBD5 gene.

== Function ==
This gene encodes a member of the methyl-CpG-binding domain (MBD) family. The MBD consists of about 70 residues and is the minimal region required for a methyl-CpG-binding protein binding specifically to methylated DNA. In addition to the MBD domain, this protein contains a PWWP domain (Pro-Trp-Trp-Pro motif), which consists of 100-150 amino acids and is found in numerous proteins that are involved in cell division, growth and differentiation. Mutations in this gene cause an autosomal dominant type of cognitive disability. The encoded protein interacts with the polycomb repressive complex PR-DUB which catalyzes the deubiquitination of a lysine residue of histone 2A. Haploinsufficiency of this gene is associated with a variety of Kleefstra syndrome involving microcephaly, intellectual disabilities, severe speech impairment, and seizures. Alternatively spliced transcript variants have been found, but their full-length nature is not determined. [provided by RefSeq, Jul 2017].

== See also ==
- Ciliopathy
