= Acrocallosal syndrome =

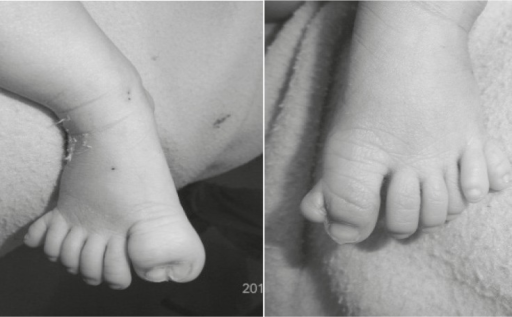
- Polydactyly and hallux duplication in a 1-day-old infant due to acrocallosal syndrome.
- Specialty: Medical genetics
- Symptoms: Agenesis of the corpus callosum, craniofacial anomalies, psychomotor retardation with hypotonia, polydactyly
- Duration: Lifelong
- Causes: Mutations in KIF7 or GLI3
- Frequency: Fewer than 50 cases

Acrocallosal syndrome (also known as ACLS) is an extremely rare autosomal recessive syndrome characterized by corpus callosum agenesis, polydactyly, multiple dysmorphic features, motor and intellectual disabilities, and other symptoms. The syndrome was first described by Albert Schinzel in 1979. Mutations in KIF7 are causative for ACLS, and mutations in GLI3 are associated with a similar syndrome.

== Signs and symptoms ==
Acrocallosal syndrome (ACLS, ACS, Schinzel-type, Hallux-duplication) is a rare, heterogeneous autosomal recessive disorder first discovered by Albert Schinzel (1979) in a 3-year-old boy. Characteristics of this syndrome include agenesis of the corpus callosum, macrocephaly, hypertelorism, poor motor skills, intellectual disability, extra fingers and toes (particularly hallux duplication), and cleft palate. Seizures may also occur.

== Mechanism ==
This disease is autosomal recessive.

Mutations in the KIF7 gene are causative for ACLS. KIF7 is a 1343 amino acid protein with a kinesin motor, coiled coil, and Gli-binding domains. It is associated with ciliary motor function and is a key factor in the ciliary Hedgehog signaling pathway that is crucial during embryogenesis. Mutations in Hedgehog signaling components such as KIF7 and GLI3 may lead to ciliopathies and defects in the brain and other areas associated with ACLS and related disorders.

Mutations in the GLI3 gene may cause ACLS or similar syndromes such as Greig cephalopolysyndactyly syndrome, Pallister–Hall syndrome, or certain types of polydactyly. KIF7 interacts with Gli transcription factors, so mutations in the KIF7 gene may be upstream effectors of GLI3, resulting in similar symptoms.

== Diagnosis ==
ACLS is typically diagnosed on the basis of physical examination. At least three of four core criteria published by Courtens et al. (1997) must be present:

1. Total or partial agenesis of the corpus callosum
2. Minor craniofacial anomalies such as macrocephaly or hypertelorism
3. Moderate to severe psychomotor retardation with hypotonia
4. Polydactyly

The differential diagnosis includes Greig cephalopolysyndactyly syndrome, orofaciodigital syndrome types I and II, Meckel–Gruber syndrome, Smith–Lemli–Opitz syndrome, Rubinstein–Taybi syndrome, Cockayne syndrome, Aicardi syndrome, Neu–Laxova syndrome, Young–Madders syndrome, oto-palato-digital syndrome type 2, Toriello–Carey syndrome, and Da Silva syndromes. ACLS may be differentiated from Greig cephalopolysyndactyly syndrome by the presence of intracranial cysts.

ACLS may be suspected antenatally if a previous child is affected, as any subsequent child has a 25% chance of having ACLS. Obstetric ultrasonography or magnetic resonance imaging can reveal polydactyly and/or cerebral malformations from the 20th week of gestation. Chorionic villus sampling and molecular genetic testing can be performed to confirm whether mutations in disease-associated genes are present.

ACLS is an extremely rare disorder, with 34 cases described in the literature as of 2005.

== Management ==
Management of ACLS consists mainly of monitoring by a pediatric neuropsychiatrist and supportive therapies or accommodations such as occupational therapy and special education plans. Surgery may be considered in early childhood to remove extra digits in case of polydactyly or resolve orofacial defects such as cleft palate. If present, seizures and renal parenchymal hypertension may be treated with anticonvulsants and antihypertensive drugs, respectively. Patients may be offered genetic and vocational counselling when appropriate.

== Prognosis ==
Lifespan may range from stillbirth to normal expectancy depending on severity of hypotonia and onset of epilepsy. Severe hypotonia can lead to fatal infant respiratory distress syndrome or apnea within the first days or weeks of life. Conversely, in mild cases, subjects live relatively normal lives with some developmental delays and mild to moderate intellectual disability.
