= TMEM216 =

Protein-coding gene in the species Homo sapiens

Identifiers
- Aliases: TMEM216, HSPC244, transmembrane protein 216
- External IDs: OMIM: 613277; MGI: 1920020; HomoloGene: 9541; GeneCards: TMEM216; OMA:TMEM216 - orthologs

Gene location (Human)
Chr.	Chromosome 11 (human)
Band	11q12.2	Start	61,392,393 bp
Band	11q12.2	End	61,398,866 bp

Gene location (Mouse)
Chr.	Chromosome 19 (mouse)
Band	19|19 A	Start	10,511,229 bp
Band	19|19 A	End	10,533,602 bp
RNA expression pattern
Bgee	Human / Mouse (ortholog); Top expressed in: gonad; anterior pituitary; left ovary; ventricular zone; right ovary; right uterine tube; mucosa of ileum; testicle; oocyte; granulocyte / Top expressed in: granulocyte; ventricular zone; neural tube; zygote; embryo; right kidney; otic placode; tibiofemoral joint; proximal tubule; embryo; More reference expression data
BioGPS	n/a
Gene ontology
Molecular function	protein binding
Cellular component	cytoplasm; integral component of membrane; cytosol; cell projection; MKS complex; cilium; ciliary transition zone; cytoskeleton; membrane
Biological process	cell projection organization; cilium assembly; ciliary basal body-plasma membrane docking; non-motile cilium assembly
Sources:Amigo / QuickGO
Orthologs
Species	Human	Mouse
Entrez	51259	68642
Ensembl	ENSG00000187049	ENSMUSG00000024667
UniProt	Q9P0N5	Q9CQC4
RefSeq (mRNA)	NM_001173990; NM_001173991; NM_016499; NM_001330285	NM_001277860; NM_001277861; NM_026798
RefSeq (protein)	NP_001167461; NP_001167462; NP_001317214; NP_057583	NP_001264789; NP_001264790; NP_081074
Location (UCSC)	Chr 11: 61.39 – 61.4 Mb	Chr 19: 10.51 – 10.53 Mb
PubMed search
- Wikidata
View/Edit Human	View/Edit Mouse

Transmembrane protein 216 is a protein in humans that is encoded by the TMEM216 gene.

== Clinical significance ==
Mutations in this gene may be associated with Meckel syndrome or Joubert syndrome.

== See also ==
- Ciliopathy
