= TMEM138 =

Protein-coding gene in the species Homo sapiens

Identifiers
- Aliases: TMEM138, HSPC196, transmembrane protein 138
- External IDs: OMIM: 614459; MGI: 1920232; HomoloGene: 9518; GeneCards: TMEM138; OMA:TMEM138 - orthologs

Gene location (Human)
Chr.	Chromosome 11 (human)
Band	11q12.2	Start	61,361,964 bp
Band	11q12.2	End	61,377,890 bp

Gene location (Mouse)
Chr.	Chromosome 19 (mouse)
Band	19|19 A	Start	10,547,842 bp
Band	19|19 A	End	10,554,726 bp
RNA expression pattern
Bgee	Human / Mouse (ortholog); Top expressed in: right adrenal gland; right adrenal cortex; left adrenal gland; left adrenal cortex; right uterine tube; right ovary; mucosa of transverse colon; olfactory zone of nasal mucosa; left ovary; left uterine tube / Top expressed in: neural layer of retina; spermatocyte; embryo; tail of embryo; ventricular zone; neural tube; embryo; lens; epiblast; genital tubercle; More reference expression data
BioGPS	n/a
Orthologs
Species	Human	Mouse
Entrez	51524	72982
Ensembl	ENSG00000149483	ENSMUSG00000024666
UniProt	Q9NPI0	Q9D6G5
RefSeq (mRNA)	NM_016464; NM_001330281	NM_001302218; NM_028411
RefSeq (protein)	NP_001317210; NP_057548	NP_001289147; NP_082687
Location (UCSC)	Chr 11: 61.36 – 61.38 Mb	Chr 19: 10.55 – 10.55 Mb
PubMed search
- Wikidata
View/Edit Human	View/Edit Mouse

Figure 1: three views of a molecular model of human TMEM237-Cterm (Uniprot Q96Q45, residues 212-390, black cartoon), TMEM138 (Uniprot Q9NPI0, residues 1-162, rainbow cartoon, blue to red from N-term to C-term), and TMEM17 (Uniprot Q86X19, residues 37-198, white cartoon). Human TMEM138 residues His96, Ala126, Ala127 and Tyr130 - which when mutated cause Joubert syndrome 16 (JBTS16) - are in sticks representation. A: the three proteins viewed from the side, in cilium membrane; extracellular side at the top, cytoplasmic side at the bottom; B: top view (from the extracellular side); C: bottom view (from the cytoplasm).

Transmembrane protein 138 is a protein that in humans is encoded by the TMEM138 gene. Transmembrane protein 138 is an integral component of the Tectonic Complex (TC, aka Transition Zone Complex, TZC). The TZC is a multi-protein complex it forms the necklace of the cell's primary cilium, a microscopic, hair-like structure protruding from the surface of a ciliate cell. In all Eukaryotes, the cilium plays vital roles in sensory processing and signaling pathways.

== Structure ==
In humans, the TMEM138 protein consists of 162 amino acids and has a predicted molecular weight of approximately 18.4 kilodaltons. It contains four transmembrane domains, which span the lipid bilayer of cellular membranes.

== Localization ==
TMEM138 has been observed in the ciliary transition zone (TZ), a critical region that connects the base of the cilium to the axoneme, another key structural component of the cilium. This localization has been demonstrated in cultured mouse cells and in C. elegans.

== Function ==
Multiple components of the transition zone complex (TZC) assemble to form molecular barriers within the ciliary membrane, collectively known as the ciliary necklace. These structures restrict passive diffusion, preventing ciliary membrane proteins from exiting the cilium and non-ciliary membrane proteins from entering it. As a result, membrane proteins must cross the ciliary necklace via active transport mechanisms. Like other TZC proteins, TMEM138 plays a crucial role in regulating protein localization and trafficking across the transition zone. For example, it appears to facilitate the proper ciliary transport and localization of rhodopsin, a key photoreceptor protein essential for vision.

== Genetic association ==
In humans, TMEM138 is encoded by the TMEM138 gene located on human chromosome 11. On this chromosome, the gene encoding TMEM138 is closely arranged in a head-to-tail configuration with another gene encoding a TZC component, TMEM216. Both proteins belong to the TZC and are implicated in similar biological processes and share intergenic regulatory elements, suggesting a coordinated expression and function related to ciliogenesis, which is the formation and maintenance of cilia. In the elephant shark, the genes encoding TMEM138 and TMEM216 are found close to the one encoding TMEM80, another component of the TZC.

== Clinical relevance ==
Mutations in the TMEM138 gene have been linked to ciliopathies—a group of disorders arising from defects in ciliary structure and function. One noted condition is Joubert syndrome (JBTS), a genetic disorder characterized by developmental delays and physical anomalies, including retinal dystrophy, seen as early-onset degeneration of photoreceptors.
