= NEK8 =

Protein-coding gene in the species Homo sapiens

Identifiers
- Aliases: NEK8, JCK, NEK12A, NPHP9, RHPD2, NIMA related kinase 8
- External IDs: OMIM: 609799; MGI: 1890646; GeneCards: NEK8
Enzyme activity
EC #	BRENDA	ExPASy	KEGG	MetaCyc
2.7.11.1	↗	↗	↗	↗

Gene location (Human)
Chr.	Chromosome 17 (human)
Band	17q11.2	Start	28,725,897 bp
Band	17q11.2	End	28,743,455 bp

Gene location (Mouse)
Chr.	Chromosome 11 (mouse)
Band	11 B5|11 46.74 cM	Start	78,056,932 bp
Band	11 B5|11 46.74 cM	End	78,067,501 bp
RNA expression pattern
Bgee	Human / Mouse (ortholog); Top expressed in: buccal mucosa cell; left lobe of thyroid gland; granulocyte; right lobe of thyroid gland; right uterine tube; lymph node; right adrenal cortex; monocyte; visceral pleura; testicle / Top expressed in: saccule; otic vesicle; lumbar spinal ganglion; spermatocyte; tail of embryo; right kidney; genital tubercle; proximal tubule; ventricular zone; granulocyte; More reference expression data
BioGPS	n/a
Gene ontology
Molecular function	kinase activity; transferase activity; nucleotide binding; protein kinase activity; protein binding; ATP binding; metal ion binding; protein serine/threonine kinase activity
Cellular component	cytoplasm; ciliary base; cell projection; cytoskeleton; ciliary inversin compartment; cilium
Biological process	animal organ morphogenesis; development of the heart; regulation of hippo signaling; determination of left/right symmetry; phosphorylation; protein phosphorylation; cilium assembly
Sources:Amigo / QuickGO
Orthologs
Databases	NCBI: entry; OMA: entry
Species	Human	Mouse
Entrez	284086	140859
Ensembl	ENSG00000160602	ENSMUSG00000017405
UniProt	Q86SG6	Q91ZR4
RefSeq (mRNA)	NM_178170	NM_080849
RefSeq (protein)	NP_835464	NP_543125
Location (UCSC)	Chr 17: 28.73 – 28.74 Mb	Chr 11: 78.06 – 78.07 Mb
PubMed search
- Wikidata
View/Edit Human	View/Edit Mouse

Serine/threonine-protein kinase Nek8, also known as never in mitosis A-related kinase 8, is an enzyme that in humans is encoded by the NEK8 gene.

== Function ==
Nek8 is a member of the serine/threonine-specific protein kinase family related to NIMA (never in mitosis, gene A) of Aspergillus nidulans. The encoded protein may play a role in cell cycle progression from G2 to M phase.

== Clinical significance ==
Mutations in the NEK8 gene associated with nephronophthisis.
