= ARMC9 =

Protein-coding gene in humans

Identifiers
- Aliases: ARMC9, ARM, KU-MEL-1, NS21, armadillo repeat containing 9, JBTS30
- External IDs: OMIM: 617612; MGI: 1926045; GeneCards: ARMC9

Gene location (Human)
Chr.	Chromosome 2 (human)
Band	2q37.1	Start	231,198,546 bp
Band	2q37.1	End	231,376,848 bp

Gene location (Mouse)
Chr.	Chromosome 1 (mouse)
Band	1|1 C5	Start	86,082,502 bp
Band	1|1 C5	End	86,206,006 bp
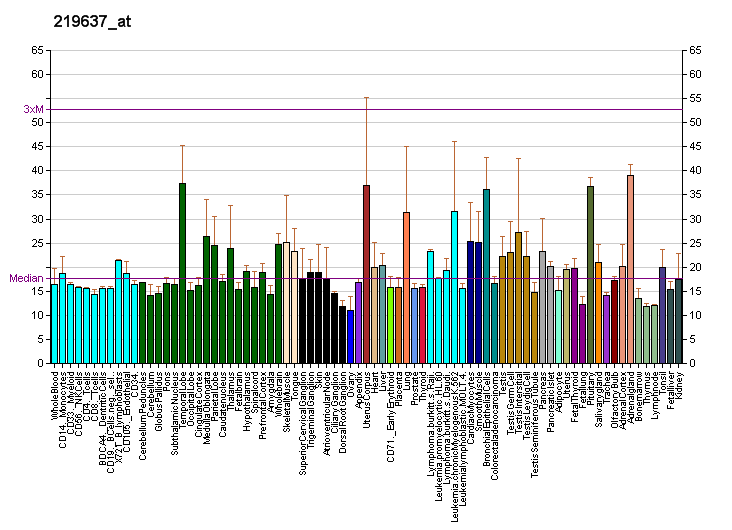

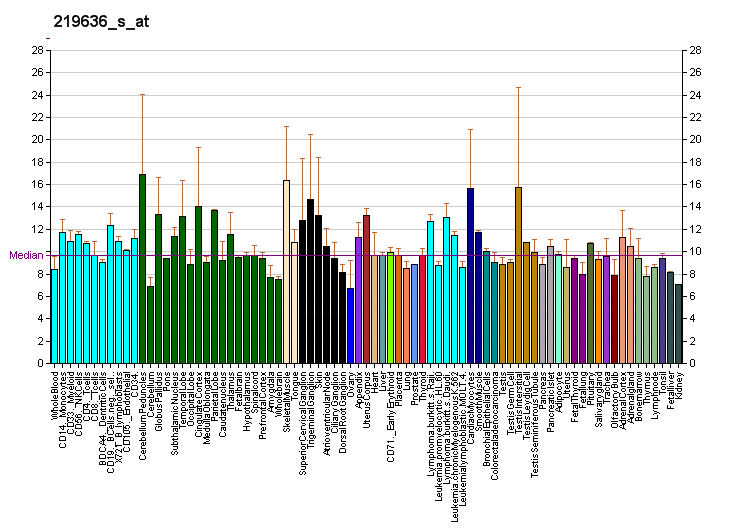
RNA expression pattern
Bgee	Human / Mouse (ortholog); Top expressed in: stromal cell of endometrium; secondary oocyte; retinal pigment epithelium; buccal mucosa cell; left adrenal gland; left adrenal cortex; right adrenal gland; right adrenal cortex; smooth muscle tissue; sural nerve / Top expressed in: spermatocyte; interventricular septum; spermatid; lumbar subsegment of spinal cord; seminiferous tubule; neural layer of retina; superior frontal gyrus; primary visual cortex; dentate gyrus of hippocampal formation granule cell; neural tube; More reference expression data
BioGPS	More reference expression data
Gene ontology
Molecular function	protein binding
Cellular component	extracellular exosome; cytoplasm; cytoskeleton; ciliary basal body; cell projection
Biological process	cell projection organization; cilium assembly
Sources:Amigo / QuickGO
Orthologs
Databases	NCBI: entry; OMA: entry
Species	Human	Mouse
Entrez	80210	78795
Ensembl	ENSG00000135931	ENSMUSG00000062590
UniProt	Q7Z3E5	Q9D2I5
RefSeq (mRNA)	NM_001271466; NM_001291656; NM_025139; NM_001352754; NM_001352755 NM_001352756; NM_001352757; NM_001352758; NM_001352759	NM_027456; NM_030184; NM_001310702
RefSeq (protein)	NP_001258395; NP_001278585; NP_079415; NP_001339683; NP_001339684 NP_001339685; NP_001339686; NP_001339687; NP_001339688; NP_001278585.1; NP_079415.3	NP_001297631; NP_081732; NP_084460
Location (UCSC)	Chr 2: 231.2 – 231.38 Mb	Chr 1: 86.08 – 86.21 Mb
PubMed search
- Wikidata
View/Edit Human	View/Edit Mouse

LisH domain-containing protein ARMC9 is a protein that in humans is encoded by the ARMC9 gene. This protein is involved ciliogenesis (the assembly of cilia). It regulates cilia length, and is important for proper acetylation and polyglutamylation of the cilia microtubules.

== Medical significance ==
Pathogenic mutations in ARMC9 are associated with a form of Joubert syndrome designated Joubert syndrome-30 (JBTS30). Those affected showed developmental delays/disability, dysfunction of movement and speech, and other variable symptoms.
