= SDCCAG8 =

Protein-coding gene in humans

Identifiers
- Aliases: SDCCAG8, BBS16, CCCAP, CCCAP SLSN7, NPHP10, NY-CO-8, SLSN7, hCCCAP, HSPC085, serologically defined colon cancer antigen 8, SHH signaling and ciliogenesis regulator SDCCAG8
- External IDs: OMIM: 613524; MGI: 1924066; GeneCards: SDCCAG8

Gene location (Human)
Chr.	Chromosome 1 (human)
Band	1q43-q44	Start	243,256,034 bp
Band	1q43-q44	End	243,500,091 bp

Gene location (Mouse)
Chr.	Chromosome 1 (mouse)
Band	1|1 H4	Start	176,814,660 bp
Band	1|1 H4	End	177,020,437 bp
RNA expression pattern
Bgee	Human / Mouse (ortholog); Top expressed in: corpus callosum; Achilles tendon; thyroid gland; bone marrow cell; left lobe of thyroid gland; right lobe of thyroid gland; sural nerve; C1 segment; right lung; tonsil / Top expressed in: neural layer of retina; ascending aorta; aortic valve; granulocyte; ventricular zone; spermatocyte; dentate gyrus of hippocampal formation granule cell; spermatid; zygote; right kidney; More reference expression data
BioGPS	n/a
Gene ontology
Molecular function	protein binding
Cellular component	cytoplasm; cytosol; cell junction; centriolar satellite; cytoskeleton; cell-cell junction; centrosome; centriole; microtubule organizing center; cell projection
Biological process	neuron migration; G2/M transition of mitotic cell cycle; microtubule organizing center organization; establishment of cell polarity; tube formation; ciliary basal body-plasma membrane docking; centrosome cycle; regulation of G2/M transition of mitotic cell cycle; regulation of cilium assembly; cell projection organization
Sources:Amigo / QuickGO
Orthologs
Databases	NCBI: entry; OMA: entry
Species	Human	Mouse
Entrez	10806	76816
Ensembl	ENSG00000054282; ENSG00000276111	ENSMUSG00000026504
UniProt	Q86SQ7	Q80UF4
RefSeq (mRNA)	NM_006642; NM_001350246; NM_001350247; NM_001350248; NM_001350249 NM_001350251	NM_029756; NM_001357390
RefSeq (protein)	NP_006633; NP_001337175; NP_001337176; NP_001337177; NP_001337178 NP_001337180	NP_084032; NP_001344319
Location (UCSC)	Chr 1: 243.26 – 243.5 Mb	Chr 1: 176.81 – 177.02 Mb
PubMed search
- Wikidata
View/Edit Human	View/Edit Mouse

Serologically defined colon cancer antigen 8 is a protein that in humans is encoded by the SDCCAG8 gene. This protein localizes to the centrioles.

== Clinical significance ==
Mutations in SDCCAG8 have been found to cause nephronophthisis-related ciliopathies.

== Interactions ==
SDCCAG8 has been shown to interact directly with OFD1, a protein that is also associated with nephronophthisis-related ciliopathies.
