= TCTN3 =

Protein-coding gene in the species Homo sapiens

Identifiers
- Aliases: TCTN3, C10orf61, JBTS18, OFD4, TECT3, tectonic family member 3
- External IDs: OMIM: 613847; MGI: 1914840; GeneCards: TCTN3

Gene location (Human)
Chr.	Chromosome 10 (human)
Band	10q24.1	Start	95,659,823 bp
Band	10q24.1	End	95,694,143 bp

Gene location (Mouse)
Chr.	Chromosome 19 (mouse)
Band	19|19 C3	Start	40,584,890 bp
Band	19|19 C3	End	40,600,677 bp
RNA expression pattern
Bgee	Human / Mouse (ortholog); Top expressed in: corpus epididymis; decidua; stromal cell of endometrium; islet of Langerhans; caput epididymis; right lobe of thyroid gland; pancreatic ductal cell; left lobe of thyroid gland; gallbladder; tail of epididymis / Top expressed in: fourth ventricle; choroid plexus of fourth ventricle; choroidal fissure; spermatocyte; saccule; otic vesicle; spermatid; lumbar subsegment of spinal cord; islet of Langerhans; visual cortex; More reference expression data
BioGPS	n/a
Orthologs
Databases	NCBI: entry; OMA: entry
Species	Human	Mouse
Entrez	26123	67590
Ensembl	ENSG00000119977	ENSMUSG00000025008
UniProt	Q6NUS6	Q8R2Q6
RefSeq (mRNA)	NM_001143973; NM_015631	NM_026260; NM_001365072
RefSeq (protein)	NP_001137445; NP_056446	NP_080536; NP_001352001
Location (UCSC)	Chr 10: 95.66 – 95.69 Mb	Chr 19: 40.58 – 40.6 Mb
PubMed search
- Wikidata
View/Edit Human	View/Edit Mouse

Tectonic family member 3 is a protein in humans that is encoded by the TCTN3 gene.

This gene encodes a member of the tectonic gene family which functions in Hedgehog signal transduction and development of the neural tube. Mutations in this gene have been associated with Oral-facial-digital syndrome IV and Joubert syndrome 18. Alternatively spliced transcript variants encoding multiple isoforms have been observed for this gene. [provided by RefSeq, Sep 2012].
