= Ataxin 10 =

Protein-coding gene in the species Homo sapiens

ATXN10

Identifiers
- Aliases: ATXN10, E46L, HUMEEP, SCA10, ataxin 10, ATX10
- External IDs: OMIM: 611150; MGI: 1859293; GeneCards: ATXN10

Gene location (Human)
Chr.	Chromosome 22 (human)
Band	22q13.31	Start	45,671,798 bp
Band	22q13.31	End	45,845,307 bp
RNA expression pattern
Bgee	Human / Mouse (ortholog); Top expressed in: ventricular zone; ganglionic eminence; gonad; prefrontal cortex; stromal cell of endometrium; islet of Langerhans; right ventricle; postcentral gyrus; pons; retinal pigment epithelium / n/a; More reference expression data
BioGPS	n/a
Gene ontology
Molecular function	enzyme binding; protein binding; identical protein binding
Cellular component	cytoplasm; perinuclear region of cytoplasm; soma; plasma membrane; dendrite; membrane; extracellular space; cytosol
Biological process	neuron projection development; nervous system development; protein homotrimerization; cilium assembly
Sources:Amigo / QuickGO
Orthologs
Databases	NCBI: entry; OMA: entry
Species	Human	Mouse
Entrez	25814	54138
Ensembl	ENSG00000130638	ENSMUSG00000016541
UniProt	Q9UBB4	P28658
RefSeq (mRNA)	NM_013236; NM_001167621	NM_016843
RefSeq (protein)	NP_001161093; NP_037368	NP_058539
Location (UCSC)	Chr 22: 45.67 – 45.85 Mb	n/a
PubMed search
- Wikidata
View/Edit Human	View/Edit Mouse

Ataxin-10 is a protein that in humans is encoded by the ATXN10 gene.

== Clinical significance ==
The autosomal dominant cerebellar ataxias (ADCAs) are a clinically and genetically heterogeneous group of disorders characterized by ataxia, dysarthria, dysmetria, and intention tremor. All ADCAs involve some degree of cerebellar dysfunction and a varying degree of signs from other components of the nervous system. A commonly accepted clinical classification (Harding, 1993) divides ADCAs into three different groups based on the presence or absence of associated symptoms such as brainstem signs or retinopathy. The presence of pyramidal and extrapyramidal symptoms and ophthalmoplegia makes the diagnosis of ADCA I, the presence of retinopathy points to ADCA II, and the absence of associated signs to ADCA III. Genetic linkage and molecular analyses revealed that ADCAs are genetically heterogeneous even within the various subtypes.

Defects in ATXN10 have been associated with Joubert syndrome.
