= Johnson–McMillin syndrome =

- Other names: Johnson neuroectodermal syndrome, alopecia–anosmia–deafness–hypogonadism syndrome
- Johnson–McMillin syndrome is inherited in an autosomal dominant manner.
- Specialty: Medical genetics

Johnson–McMillin syndrome, also known as Johnson neuroectodermal syndrome, is a neuroectodermal syndrome characterized by alopecia, microtia, conductive hearing loss, anosmia/hyposmia, and hypogonadotropic hypogonadism.

== See also ==
- List of cutaneous conditions
