= WD repeat containing planar cell polarity effector =

Protein-coding gene in the species Homo sapiens

WDPCP

Identifiers
- Aliases: WDPCP, BBS15, C2orf86, FRITZ, FRTZ, CHDTHP, WD repeat containing planar cell polarity effector, CPLANE5
- External IDs: OMIM: 613580; MGI: 2144467; GeneCards: WDPCP

Gene location (Human)
Chr.	Chromosome 2 (human)
Band	2p15	Start	63,119,559 bp
Band	2p15	End	63,827,843 bp

Gene location (Mouse)
Chr.	Chromosome 11 (mouse)
Band	11 A3.1|11 13.9 cM	Start	21,522,235 bp
Band	11 A3.1|11 13.9 cM	End	21,848,989 bp
RNA expression pattern
Bgee	Human / Mouse (ortholog); Top expressed in: mucosa of paranasal sinus; palpebral conjunctiva; superficial temporal artery; sperm; cardiac muscle tissue of right atrium; myocardium of left ventricle; pancreatic epithelial cell; buccal mucosa cell; germinal epithelium; skin of arm / Top expressed in: fourth ventricle; choroid plexus of fourth ventricle; spermatocyte; spermatid; choroidal fissure; seminiferous tubule; nasolacrimal duct; lumbar spinal ganglion; right kidney; olfactory system; More reference expression data
BioGPS	n/a
Orthologs
Databases	NCBI: entry; OMA: entry
Species	Human	Mouse
Entrez	51057	216560
Ensembl	ENSG00000143951	ENSMUSG00000020319
UniProt	O95876	Q8C456
RefSeq (mRNA)	NM_001042692; NM_015910; NM_001354044; NM_001354045	NM_145425; NM_001364768
RefSeq (protein)	NP_001036157; NP_056994; NP_001340973; NP_001340974	NP_663400; NP_001351697
Location (UCSC)	Chr 2: 63.12 – 63.83 Mb	Chr 11: 21.52 – 21.85 Mb
PubMed search
- Wikidata
View/Edit Human	View/Edit Mouse

WD repeat containing planar cell polarity effector is a protein that in humans is encoded by the WDPCP gene.

== Function ==
This gene encodes a cytoplasmic WD40 repeat protein. A similar gene in frogs encodes a planar cell polarity protein that plays a critical role in collective cell movement and ciliogenesis by mediating septin localization. Mutations in this gene are associated with Bardet-Biedl syndrome 15 and may also play a role in Meckel-Gruber syndrome. Alternative splicing results in multiple transcript variants.
