= CILK1 =

Protein-coding gene in the species Homo sapiens

Identifiers
- Aliases: CILK1, ECO, LCK2, MRK, intestinal cell (MAK-like) kinase, intestinal cell kinase, EJM10, ICK, ciliogenesis associated kinase 1, hICK
- External IDs: OMIM: 612325; MGI: 1934157; HomoloGene: 69218; GeneCards: CILK1; OMA:CILK1 - orthologs

Gene location (Human)
Chr.	Chromosome 6 (human)
Band	6p12.1	Start	53,001,279 bp
Band	6p12.1	End	53,061,824 bp

Gene location (Mouse)
Chr.	Chromosome 9 (mouse)
Band	9|9 E1	Start	78,016,474 bp
Band	9|9 E1	End	78,079,389 bp
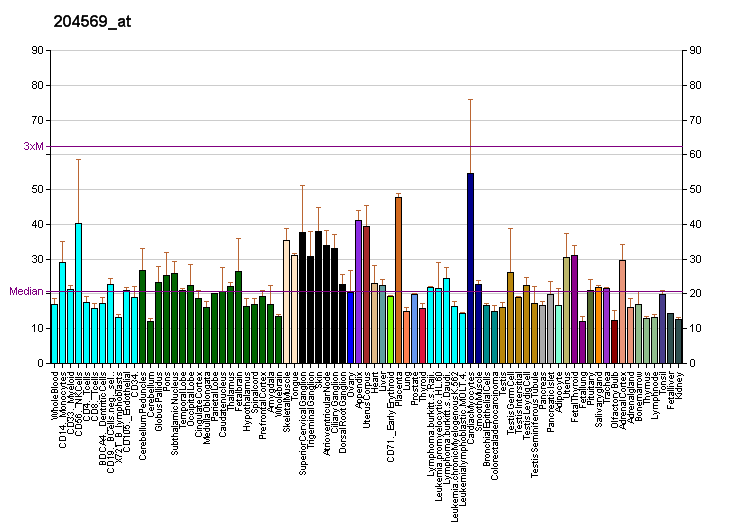
RNA expression pattern
Bgee	Human / Mouse (ortholog); Top expressed in: palpebral conjunctiva; left adrenal gland; left adrenal cortex; right adrenal cortex; ganglionic eminence; olfactory zone of nasal mucosa; rectum; placenta; Achilles tendon; C1 segment / Top expressed in: trigeminal ganglion; Rostral migratory stream; epithelium of stomach; Paneth cell; gastrula; external carotid artery; genital tubercle; ciliary body; substantia nigra; zygote; More reference expression data
BioGPS	More reference expression data
Gene ontology
Molecular function	transferase activity; nucleotide binding; protein kinase activity; metal ion binding; kinase activity; protein serine/threonine kinase activity; protein binding; ATP binding; magnesium ion binding
Cellular component	ciliary basal body; cytosol; cell projection; ciliary tip; cytoskeleton; cilium; ciliary base; nucleus; cytoplasm; fibrillar center
Biological process	intracellular signal transduction; phosphorylation; multicellular organism development; protein phosphorylation; cell projection organization; signal transduction; intraciliary anterograde transport; intraciliary retrograde transport; cilium assembly; regulation of gene expression; intraciliary transport
Sources:Amigo / QuickGO
Orthologs
Species	Human	Mouse
Entrez	22858	56542
Ensembl	ENSG00000112144	ENSMUSG00000009828
UniProt	Q9UPZ9	Q9JKV2
RefSeq (mRNA)	NM_014920; NM_016513; NM_001375397; NM_001375398; NM_001375399 NM_001375400; NM_001375401; NM_001375402; NM_173041	NM_001163780; NM_019987
RefSeq (protein)	NP_055735; NP_057597; NP_001362326; NP_001362327; NP_001362328 NP_001362329; NP_001362330; NP_001362331	NP_001157252; NP_064371
Location (UCSC)	Chr 6: 53 – 53.06 Mb	Chr 9: 78.02 – 78.08 Mb
PubMed search
- Wikidata
View/Edit Human	View/Edit Mouse

Serine/threonine-protein kinase ICK, also known as ciliogenesis associated kinase 1, is an enzyme that in humans is encoded by the CILK1 gene.

Eukaryotic protein kinases are enzymes that belong to a very extensive family of proteins which share a conserved catalytic core common with both serine/threonine and tyrosine protein kinases. This gene encodes an intestinal serine/threonine kinase harboring a dual phosphorylation site found in mitogen-activating protein (MAP) kinases. The protein localizes to the intestinal crypt region and is thought to be important in intestinal epithelial cell proliferation and differentiation. Alternative splicing has been observed at this locus and two variants, encoding the same isoform, have been identified.
