= Cerebrooculonasal syndrome =

- Other names: Cerebro-oculo-nasal syndrome
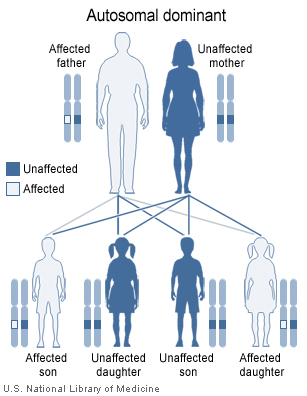
- Autosomal dominant inheritance
- Frequency: 0.0001%

Cerebrooculonasal syndrome is a rare autosomal dominant multisystem malformation syndrome characterized by bilateral anophthalmia, abnormal nares, central nervous system anomalies, and neurodevelopmental delay.

== Signs and symptoms ==
Features of this condition include:

- Head and neck: anteverted nares, broad forehead, broad philtrum, cleft palate, downturned corners of mouth, epicanthus, high palate, long philtrum, narrow palate, proboscis, prominent forehead, prominent nasal bridge, short nose, solitary median maxillary central incisor syndrome, sparse eyebrows, U-shaped upper lip vermilion, underdeveloped supraorbital ridges
- Limbs: postaxial hand polydactyly, postaxial polydactyly
- Eyes: anophthalmia, hypertelorism, iris coloboma, optic nerve hypoplasia, ptosis
- Integument: sparse eyelashes
- Musculoskeletal system: brachycephaly, craniosynostosis, Dandy–Walker malformation, frontal bossing, macrocephaly, malar flattening
- Nervous system: cerebellar vermis hypoplasia, encephalocele, global developmental delay, hydrocephalus, hypoplasia of the corpus callosum, intellectual disability, interhemispheric cyst, seizure, ventriculomegaly
- Ear malformations: conductive hearing impairment, low-set ears, posteriorly rotated ears
- Growth abnormality: postnatal growth retardation
- Urogenital tract malformation: hypoplastic male external genitalia

== Cause ==
Cerebrooculonasal syndrome is presumed to be a genetic disorder, however no specific mutations responsible have been identified. One patient previously diagnosed with holoprosencephaly-7 displayed a V908G change on the PTCH gene. An autosomal dominant inheritance has been suggested due to all known cases having being sporadic. Advanced paternal age effect may also be involved.

== History ==
Cerebrooculonasal syndrome was first described in 1993. Only 16 individuals have ever been formally diagnosed with the condition.
