= Acrofrontofacionasal dysostosis =

- Other names: Richieri-Costa-Colletto syndrome
- Acrofrontofacionasal dysostosis is inherited in an autosomal recessive manner.
- Specialty: Medical genetics

Acrofrontofacionasal dysostosis is an extremely rare disorder, characterized by intellectual disability, short stature, hypertelorism, broad notched nasal tip, cleft lip/palate, postaxial camptobrachypolysyndactyly, fibular hypoplasia, and anomalies of foot structure.

An association with mutations in the neuroblastoma amplified sequence gene (NBAS) has been reported. This gene is located on the short arm of chromosome 2. Mutations in this gene have been associated with the short stature, optic nerve atrophy, and Pelger–Huët anomaly syndrome and infantile liver failure syndrome.
