= ARL13B =

Protein-coding gene in the species Homo sapiens

Identifiers
- Aliases: ARL13B, ARL2L1, JBTS8, ADP ribosylation factor like GTPase 13B
- External IDs: OMIM: 608922; MGI: 1915396; GeneCards: ARL13B

Gene location (Human)
| Chr. | Chromosome 3 (human) |
| Band | 3q11.1-q11.2 | Start | 93,980,139 bp |
| Band | 3q11.1-q11.2 | End | 94,055,678 bp |

Gene location (Mouse)
| Chr. | Chromosome 16 (mouse) |
| Band | 16|16 C1.3 | Start | 62,614,048 bp |
| Band | 16|16 C1.3 | End | 62,667,403 bp |
RNA expression pattern
| Bgee | Human / Mouse (ortholog); Top expressed in: secondary oocyte; Achilles tendon; bronchial epithelial cell; sural nerve; testicle; ventricular zone; cartilage tissue; tail of epididymis; mucosa of paranasal sinus; lower lobe of lung / Top expressed in: spermatid; neural layer of retina; hand; otolith organ; utricle; olfactory epithelium; hair follicle; retinal pigment epithelium; secondary oocyte; zygote; More reference expression data |
| BioGPS | n/a |
Gene ontology
| Molecular function | nucleotide binding; GTP binding; protein binding |
| Cellular component | motile cilium; axoneme; cell projection; membrane; intracellular anatomical structure; ciliary membrane; plasma membrane; cilium; non-motile cilium |
| Biological process | smoothened signaling pathway; interneuron migration from the subpallium to the cortex; left/right axis specification; heart looping; formation of radial glial scaffolds; neural tube patterning; determination of left/right symmetry; dorsal/ventral pattern formation; response to lithium ion; cilium assembly; non-motile cilium assembly; receptor localization to non-motile cilium |
Sources:Amigo / QuickGO
Orthologs
| Databases | NCBI: entry; OMA: entry |
| Species | Human | Mouse |
| Entrez | 200894 | 68146 |
| Ensembl | ENSG00000169379 | ENSMUSG00000022911 |
| UniProt | Q3SXY8 | Q640N2 |
| RefSeq (mRNA) | NM_001174150; NM_001174151; NM_144996; NM_182896; NM_001321328 | NM_026577 |
| RefSeq (protein) | NP_001167621; NP_001167622; NP_001308257; NP_659433; NP_878899 | NP_080853 |
| Location (UCSC) | Chr 3: 93.98 – 94.06 Mb | Chr 16: 62.61 – 62.67 Mb |
| PubMed search |
- Wikidata
| View/Edit Human | View/Edit Mouse |

ADP-ribosylation factor-like protein 13B (ARL13B), also known as ADP-ribosylation factor-like protein 2-like 1, is a protein that in humans is encoded by the ARL13B gene.

== Function ==
This gene encodes a member of the ADP-ribosylation factor-like family. The encoded protein is a small GTPase that contains both N-terminal and C-terminal guanine nucleotide-binding motifs. This protein is localized in the cilia and plays a role in cilia formation and in maintenance of cilia.

== Clinical significance ==
Mutations in the ARL13B gene are associated with the Joubert syndrome.
