= TMCO1 =

Protein-coding gene in humans

Identifiers
- Aliases: TMCO1, HP10122, PCIA3, PNAS-136, TMCC4, transmembrane and coiled-coil domains 1
- External IDs: OMIM: 614123; MGI: 1921173; GeneCards: TMCO1

Gene location (Human)
Chr.	Chromosome 1 (human)
Band	1q24.1	Start	165,724,293 bp
Band	1q24.1	End	165,827,755 bp

Gene location (Mouse)
Chr.	Chromosome 1 (mouse)
Band	1|1 H2.3	Start	167,135,947 bp
Band	1|1 H2.3	End	167,161,547 bp
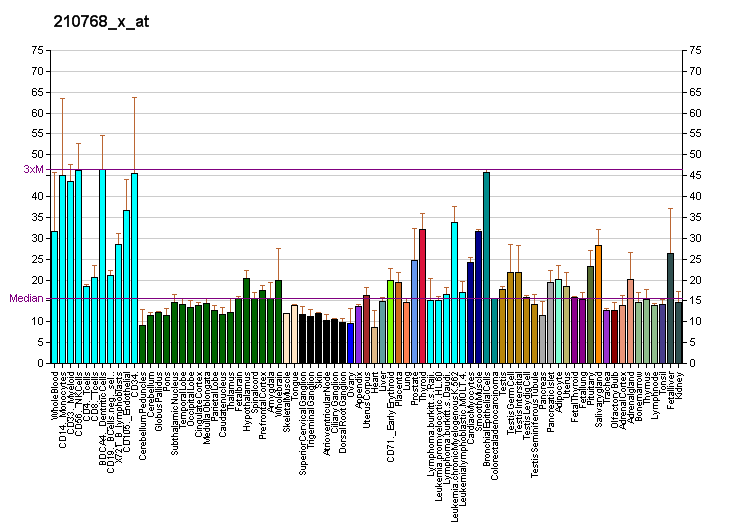

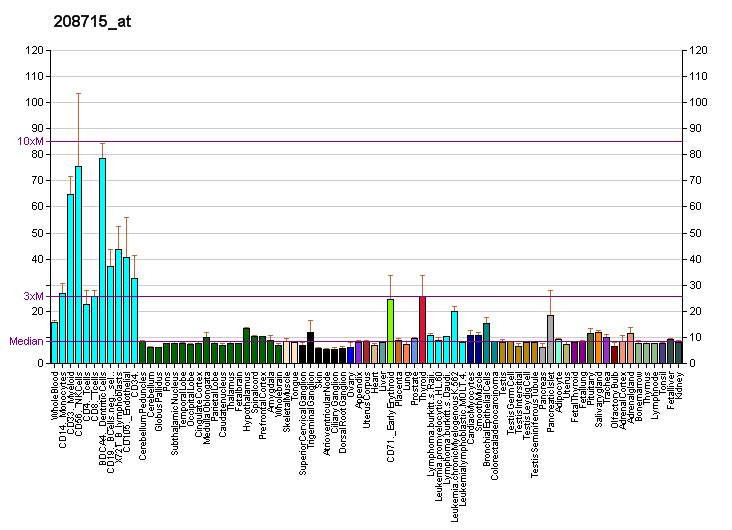

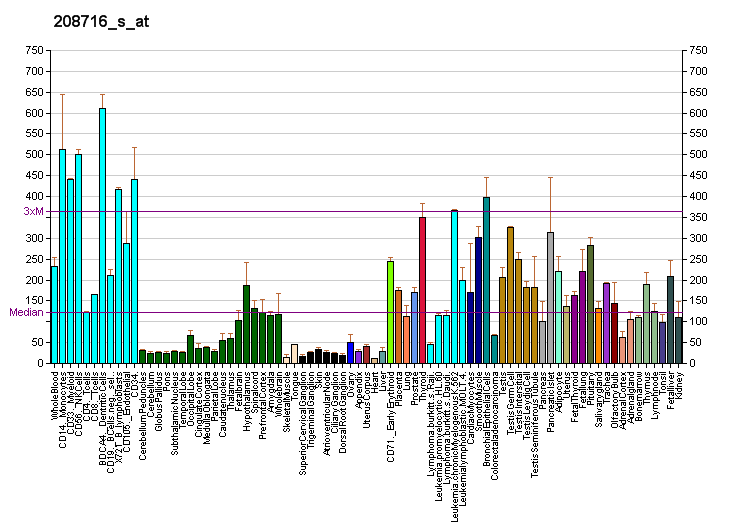
RNA expression pattern
Bgee	Human / Mouse (ortholog); Top expressed in: Achilles tendon; Epithelium of choroid plexus; rectum; islet of Langerhans; jejunal mucosa; gallbladder; mucosa of colon; mucosa of transverse colon; bronchial epithelial cell; mucosa of sigmoid colon / Top expressed in: right kidney; seminal vesicula; molar; parotid gland; left lung lobe; spermatocyte; decidua; submandibular gland; atrioventricular valve; human kidney; More reference expression data
BioGPS	More reference expression data
Gene ontology
Molecular function	calcium channel activity
Cellular component	membrane; endoplasmic reticulum membrane; Golgi membrane; Golgi apparatus; integral component of membrane; endoplasmic reticulum; integral component of endoplasmic reticulum membrane
Biological process	calcium ion transport; ER overload response; ion transport; calcium ion transmembrane transport; endoplasmic reticulum calcium ion homeostasis
Sources:Amigo / QuickGO
Orthologs
Databases	NCBI: entry; OMA: entry
Species	Human	Mouse
Entrez	54499	68944
Ensembl	ENSG00000143183	ENSMUSG00000052428
UniProt	Q9UM00	Q921L3
RefSeq (mRNA)	NM_001256164; NM_001256165; NM_019026; NM_001366129	NM_001039483; NM_026881
RefSeq (protein)	NP_001243093; NP_001243094; NP_061899	NP_001034572
Location (UCSC)	Chr 1: 165.72 – 165.83 Mb	Chr 1: 167.14 – 167.16 Mb
PubMed search
- Wikidata
View/Edit Human	View/Edit Mouse

Transmembrane and coiled-coil domain-containing protein 1 is a protein that in humans is encoded by the TMCO1 gene.
