= ARID2 =

Protein-coding gene in humans

Identifiers
- Aliases: ARID2, BAF200, p200, AT-rich interaction domain 2, CSS6, SMARCF3
- External IDs: OMIM: 609539; MGI: 1924294; GeneCards: ARID2

Gene location (Human)
Chr.	Chromosome 12 (human)
Band	12q12	Start	45,729,706 bp
Band	12q12	End	45,908,040 bp

Gene location (Mouse)
Chr.	Chromosome 15 (mouse)
Band	15|15 F1	Start	96,185,399 bp
Band	15|15 F1	End	96,302,873 bp
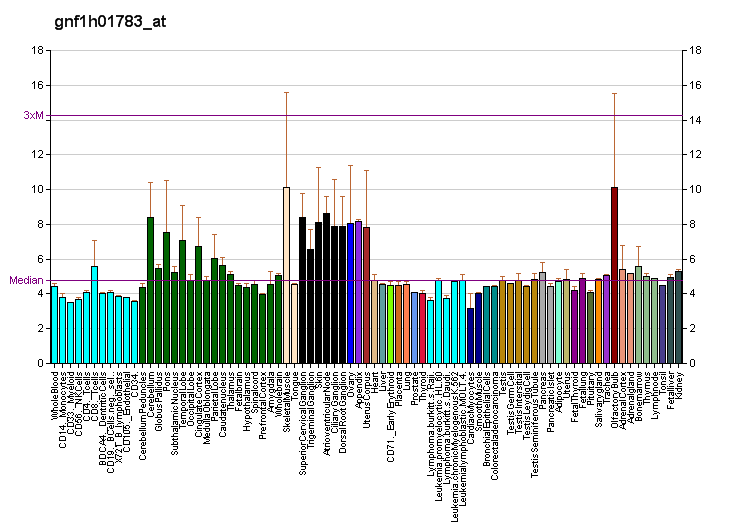

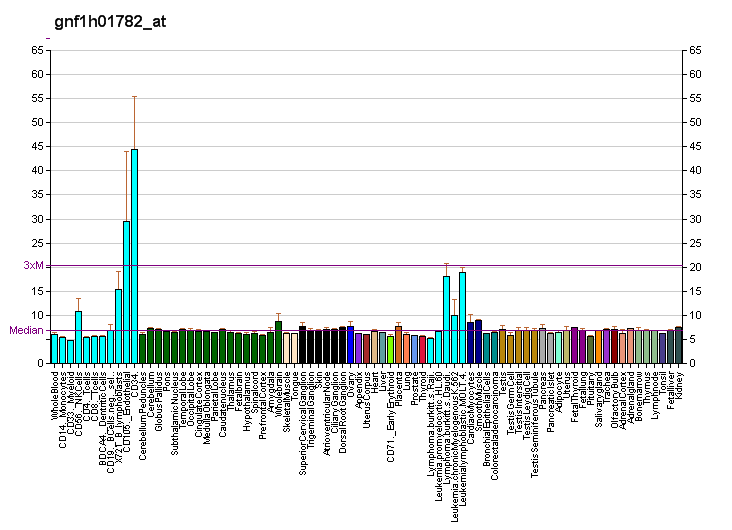
RNA expression pattern
Bgee	Human / Mouse (ortholog); Top expressed in: sperm; pancreatic ductal cell; secondary oocyte; bone marrow cell; thymus; testicle; ventricular zone; nasal epithelium; epithelium of colon; ganglionic eminence / Top expressed in: Rostral migratory stream; hair follicle; primitive streak; ciliary body; internal carotid artery; external carotid artery; vestibular membrane of cochlear duct; hand; vas deferens; iris; More reference expression data
BioGPS	More reference expression data
Gene ontology
Molecular function	DNA binding; protein binding; metal ion binding; nucleic acid binding; DNA-binding transcription factor activity, RNA polymerase II-specific
Cellular component	plasma membrane; nucleus; nucleoplasm
Biological process	nucleosome disassembly; regulation of transcription, DNA-templated; transcription, DNA-templated; negative regulation of cell migration; negative regulation of cell population proliferation; heart morphogenesis; homeostatic process; embryonic organ development; cardiac muscle cell proliferation; coronary artery morphogenesis; chromatin organization; regulation of transcription by RNA polymerase II
Sources:Amigo / QuickGO
Orthologs
Databases	NCBI: entry; OMA: entry
Species	Human	Mouse
Entrez	196528	77044
Ensembl	ENSG00000189079	ENSMUSG00000033237
UniProt	Q68CP9	E9Q7E2
RefSeq (mRNA)	NM_152641; NM_001347839	NM_175251
RefSeq (protein)	NP_001334768; NP_689854	NP_780460
Location (UCSC)	Chr 12: 45.73 – 45.91 Mb	Chr 15: 96.19 – 96.3 Mb
PubMed search
- Wikidata
View/Edit Human	View/Edit Mouse

AT-rich interactive domain-containing protein 2 (ARID2) is a protein that in humans is encoded by the ARID2 gene.

== Function ==
ARID2 is a subunit of the PBAF chromatin-remodeling complex, which facilitates ligand-dependent transcriptional activation by nuclear receptors.

== Structure ==
The ARID2 protein contains two conserved C-terminal C2H2 zinc fingers motifs, a region rich in the amino acid residues proline and glutamine, a RFX (regulatory factor X)-type winged-helix DNA-binding domain, and a conserved N-terminal AT-rich DNA interaction domain—the last domain for which the protein is named.

== Clinical significance ==
Mutation studies have revealed ARID2 to be a significant tumor suppressor in many cancer subtypes. ARID2 mutations are prevalent in hepatocellular carcinoma and melanoma. Mutations are present in a smaller but significant fraction in a wide range of other tumors. ARID2 mutations are enriched in hepatitis C virus-associated hepatocellular carcinoma in the US and European patient populations compared with the overall mutation frequency.
