= Tetratricopeptide repeat domain 21B =

Protein-coding human gene

TTC21B

Identifiers
- Aliases: TTC21B, ATD4, IFT139, JBTS11, NPHP12, SRTD4, THM1, Nbla10696, IFT139B, tetratricopeptide repeat domain 21B, FAP60, FLA17
- External IDs: OMIM: 612014; MGI: 1920918; GeneCards: TTC21B

Gene location (Human)
Chr.	Chromosome 2 (human)
Band	2q24.3	Start	165,857,475 bp
Band	2q24.3	End	165,953,851 bp

Gene location (Mouse)
Chr.	Chromosome 2 (mouse)
Band	2|2 C1.3	Start	66,014,671 bp
Band	2|2 C1.3	End	66,086,961 bp
RNA expression pattern
Bgee	Human / Mouse (ortholog); Top expressed in: right uterine tube; Achilles tendon; cerebellar hemisphere; right hemisphere of cerebellum; sural nerve; testicle; ventricular zone; canal of the cervix; left ovary; right ovary / Top expressed in: spermatocyte; seminiferous tubule; spermatid; superior cervical ganglion; hand; condyle; medullary collecting duct; genital tubercle; tail of embryo; fossa; More reference expression data
BioGPS	n/a
Orthologs
Databases	NCBI: entry; OMA: entry
Species	Human	Mouse
Entrez	79809	73668
Ensembl	ENSG00000123607	ENSMUSG00000034848
UniProt	Q7Z4L5	Q0HA38
RefSeq (mRNA)	NM_024753	NM_001047604; NM_001290669
RefSeq (protein)	NP_079029	NP_001041069; NP_001277598
Location (UCSC)	Chr 2: 165.86 – 165.95 Mb	Chr 2: 66.01 – 66.09 Mb
PubMed search
- Wikidata
View/Edit Human	View/Edit Mouse

Tetratricopeptide repeat domain 21B is a protein that in humans is encoded by the TTC21B gene.

== Function ==
This gene encodes a member of TTC21 family, containing several tetratricopeptide repeat (TPR) domains. This protein is localized to the cilium axoneme, and may play a role in retrograde intraflagellar transport in cilia. Mutations in this gene are associated with various ciliopathies, nephronophthisis 12, and asphyxiating thoracic dystrophy 4. [provided by RefSeq, Oct 2011].
