= CC2D2A =

Protein-coding gene in the species Homo sapiens

Identifiers
- Aliases: CC2D2A, JBTS9, MKS6, coiled-coil and C2 domain containing 2A, COACH2, RP93
- External IDs: OMIM: 612013; MGI: 1924487; GeneCards: CC2D2A

Gene location (Human)
Chr.	Chromosome 4 (human)
Band	4p15.32	Start	15,469,865 bp
Band	4p15.32	End	15,601,552 bp

Gene location (Mouse)
Chr.	Chromosome 5 (mouse)
Band	5|5 B3	Start	43,662,346 bp
Band	5|5 B3	End	43,740,972 bp
RNA expression pattern
Bgee	Human / Mouse (ortholog); Top expressed in: right uterine tube; bronchial epithelial cell; ventricular zone; Achilles tendon; olfactory zone of nasal mucosa; epithelium of colon; sural nerve; right coronary artery; ganglionic eminence; popliteal artery / Top expressed in: retinal pigment epithelium; pituitary gland; otolith organ; utricle; ciliary body; iris; neural layer of retina; autopod region; foot; hand; More reference expression data
BioGPS	n/a
Orthologs
Databases	NCBI: entry; OMA: entry
Species	Human	Mouse
Entrez	57545	231214
Ensembl	ENSG00000048342	ENSMUSG00000039765
UniProt	Q9P2K1	Q8CFW7
RefSeq (mRNA)	NM_001080522; NM_001164720; NM_020785; NM_001378615; NM_001378617	NM_172274; NM_001359903; NM_001359904; NM_001359905; NM_001359906
RefSeq (protein)	NP_001073991; NP_001158192; NP_065836; NP_001365544; NP_001365546	NP_758478; NP_001346832; NP_001346833; NP_001346834; NP_001346835
Location (UCSC)	Chr 4: 15.47 – 15.6 Mb	Chr 5: 43.66 – 43.74 Mb
PubMed search
- Wikidata
View/Edit Human	View/Edit Mouse

Coiled-coil and C2 domain-containing protein 2A that in humans is encoded by the CC2D2A gene.

== Function ==
This gene encodes a coiled-coil and calcium binding domain protein that appears to play a critical role in cilia formation.

== Clinical significance ==
Mutations in the CC2D2A gene are associated with Meckel syndrome as well as Joubert syndrome.
