= CEP290 =

Protein-coding gene in the species Homo sapiens

Identifiers
- Aliases: CEP290, 3H11Ag, BBS14, CT87, JBTS5, LCA10, MKS4, NPHP6, POC3, SLSN6, rd16, centrosomal protein 290
- External IDs: OMIM: 610142; MGI: 2384917; GeneCards: CEP290

Gene location (Human)
Chr.	Chromosome 12 (human)
Band	12q21.32	Start	88,049,016 bp
Band	12q21.32	End	88,142,099 bp

Gene location (Mouse)
Chr.	Chromosome 10 (mouse)
Band	10 D1|10 51.48 cM	Start	100,323,420 bp
Band	10 D1|10 51.48 cM	End	100,410,702 bp
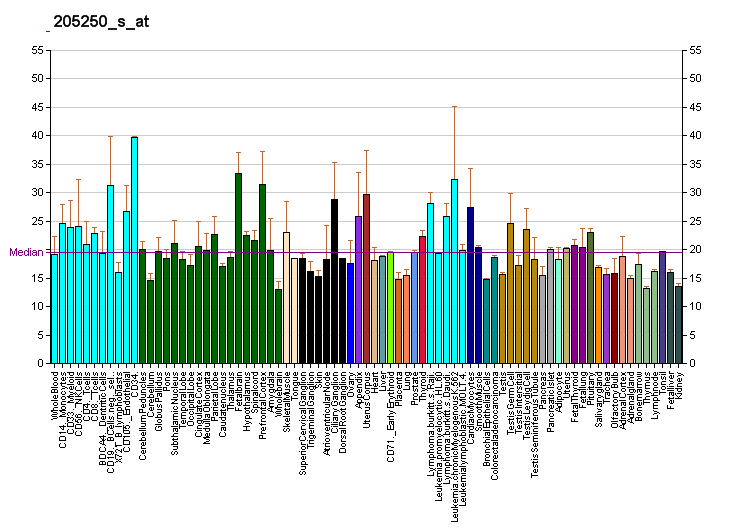

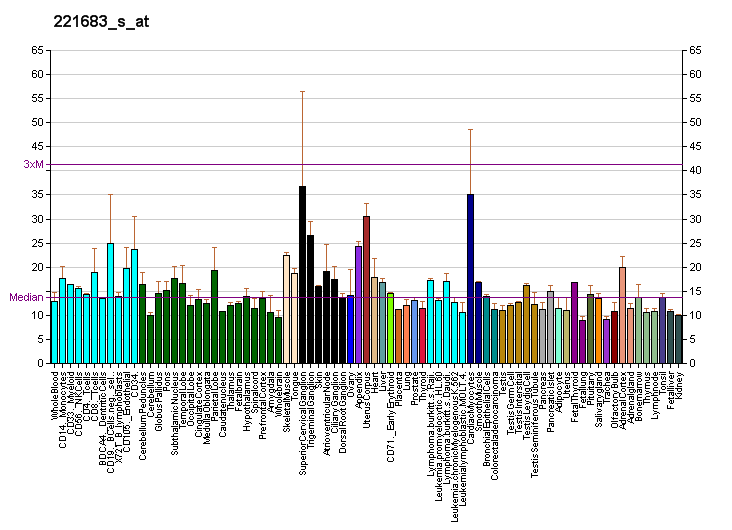
RNA expression pattern
Bgee	Human / Mouse (ortholog); Top expressed in: right uterine tube; testicle; ventricular zone; bronchial epithelial cell; Achilles tendon; endothelial cell; Brodmann area 23; sural nerve; left ovary; right ovary / Top expressed in: spermatid; spermatocyte; neural layer of retina; tail of embryo; genital tubercle; olfactory epithelium; ventricular zone; pineal gland; Epithelium of choroid plexus; morula; More reference expression data
BioGPS	More reference expression data
Gene ontology
Molecular function	protein binding; microtubule minus-end binding; identical protein binding
Cellular component	cytoplasm; cytosol; centrosome; cell projection; MKS complex; membrane; gamma-tubulin complex; centriolar satellite; ciliary transition zone; cilium; photoreceptor connecting cilium; microtubule organizing center; cytoskeleton; nucleus; ciliary basal body; extracellular region; centriole; cytoplasmic vesicle; specific granule lumen; protein-containing complex
Biological process	positive regulation of intracellular protein transport; pronephros development; otic vesicle formation; hindbrain development; positive regulation of transcription, DNA-templated; cell projection organization; G2/M transition of mitotic cell cycle; regulation of establishment of protein localization; eye photoreceptor cell development; protein transport; cilium assembly; neutrophil degranulation; ciliary basal body-plasma membrane docking; regulation of G2/M transition of mitotic cell cycle; transport
Sources:Amigo / QuickGO
Orthologs
Databases	NCBI: entry; OMA: entry
Species	Human	Mouse
Entrez	80184	216274
Ensembl	ENSG00000198707	ENSMUSG00000019971
UniProt	O15078	Q6A078
RefSeq (mRNA)	NM_025114	NM_146009; NM_001400997
RefSeq (protein)	NP_079390	NP_666121; NP_001387926
Location (UCSC)	Chr 12: 88.05 – 88.14 Mb	Chr 10: 100.32 – 100.41 Mb
PubMed search
- Wikidata
View/Edit Human	View/Edit Mouse

Centrosomal protein of 290 kDa is a protein that in humans is encoded by the CEP290 gene. CEP290 is located on the Q arm of chromosome 12.

== Function ==
The gene CEP290 is a centrosomal protein that plays an important role in centrosome and cilia development. This gene is vital in the formation of the primary cilium, a small antenna-like projections of the cell membrane that plays an important role in the photoreceptors at the back of the retina (which detect light and color) and in the kidney, brain, and many other organs of the body. Knocking down levels of the CEP290 gene transcript resulted in dramatic suppression of ciliogenesis in retinal pigment epithelial cells in culture, proving just how important CEP290 is to cilia formation.

On a molecular level, CEP290 has been shown to play a critical regulatory and structural role in primary cilium formation. Recent studies have implicated CEP290 as a microtubule and membrane binding protein that might serve as a structural link between the microtubule core of the cilium and the overlying ciliary membrane. Disruption of CEP290's microtubule binding domain in the rd16 mouse model of CEP290 disease has been shown to result in rapid and dramatic retinal degeneration, demonstrating the importance of CEP290 microtubule binding in disease. The role of CEP290 in promoting ciliogenesis is inhibited both by auto-regulatory domains found at either end of the CEP290 protein and through CEP290's interaction with the inhibitory protein CP110.

The discovery of the CEP290 gene has led researchers to find another gene critical in retinal function, LCA5. Clinical trials involving gene replacement of these two genes have started in Philadelphia, where researchers are hopeful that Leber Congenital Amaurosis will one day be cured.

== Structure ==
This gene encodes a protein with 13 putative coiled-coil domains, a region with homology to SMC chromosome segregation ATPases, six KID motifs, three tropomyosin homology domains and an ATP/GTP binding site motif A. The protein is localized to the centrosome and cilia and has sites for N-glycosylation, tyrosine sulfation, phosphorylation, N-myristoylation, and amidation.

== Clinical significance ==
Mutations in this gene have been associated with Joubert syndrome and nephronophthisis, and recently with a frequent form of Leber's congenital amaurosis, called LCA10. The presence of antibodies against this protein is associated with several forms of cancer.

A mutation in this gene leads to infant and child blindness, a disease known as Leber Congenital Amaurosis. As of today, 35 different mutations in CEP290 are responsible for causing LCA. Other mutations in CEP290 have also been identified in causing Meckel-Gruber syndrome, Senior–Løken syndrome,and Bardet-Biedl syndrome. A defective CEP290 gene is usually the cause of these disorders due to abnormal cilia. It is unknown how one mutation in a gene can cause so many different types of syndromes, particularly many of which affect the central nervous system.
