= CPLANE1 =

Protein-coding gene in humans

Identifiers
- Aliases: CPLANE1, JBTS17, OFD6, Hug, chromosome 5 open reading frame 42, ciliogenesis and planar polarity effector 1, C5orf42, ciliogenesis and planar polarity effector complex subunit 1
- External IDs: OMIM: 614571; MGI: 1920942; GeneCards: CPLANE1

Gene location (Human)
| Chr. | Chromosome 5 (human) |
| Band | 5p13.2 | Start | 37,106,228 bp |
| Band | 5p13.2 | End | 37,249,376 bp |

Gene location (Mouse)
| Chr. | Chromosome 15 (mouse) |
| Band | 15|15 A1 | Start | 8,169,106 bp |
| Band | 15|15 A1 | End | 8,271,158 bp |
RNA expression pattern
| Bgee | Human / Mouse (ortholog); Top expressed in: sural nerve; Achilles tendon; testicle; ventricular zone; right hemisphere of cerebellum; ganglionic eminence; right uterine tube; germinal epithelium; epithelium of colon; gonad / Top expressed in: spermatid; Rostral migratory stream; substantia nigra; spermatocyte; genital tubercle; hand; tail of embryo; medullary collecting duct; otolith organ; trigeminal ganglion; More reference expression data |
| BioGPS | n/a |
Orthologs
| Databases | NCBI: entry; OMA: entry |
| Species | Human | Mouse |
| Entrez | 65250 | 73692 |
| Ensembl | ENSG00000197603 | ENSMUSG00000039801 |
| UniProt | Q9H799 | Q8CE72 |
| RefSeq (mRNA) | NM_023073; NM_001384732 | NM_001162906 |
| RefSeq (protein) | NP_075561 | NP_001156378 |
| Location (UCSC) | Chr 5: 37.11 – 37.25 Mb | Chr 15: 8.17 – 8.27 Mb |
| PubMed search |
- Wikidata
| View/Edit Human | View/Edit Mouse |

Ciliogenesis And Planar Polarity Effector 1 is a protein that in humans is encoded by the CPLANE1 gene.
