= KIF7 =

Motor protein found in humans

Identifiers
- Aliases: KIF7, ACLS, HLS2, JBTS12, UNQ340, AGBK, kinesin family member 7
- External IDs: OMIM: 611254; MGI: 1098239; GeneCards: KIF7
Available structures
| PDB | Ortholog search: PDBe RCSB |
| PDB | List of PDB id codes 2XT3, 4A14 |

Gene location (Human)
| Chr. | Chromosome 15 (human) |
| Band | 15q26.1 | Start | 89,608,789 bp |
| Band | 15q26.1 | End | 89,655,467 bp |

Gene location (Mouse)
| Chr. | Chromosome 7 (mouse) |
| Band | 7|7 D2 | Start | 79,347,846 bp |
| Band | 7|7 D2 | End | 79,365,468 bp |
RNA expression pattern
| Bgee | Human / Mouse (ortholog); Top expressed in: gonad; ascending aorta; right ovary; ventricular zone; gastric mucosa; stromal cell of endometrium; left ovary; Descending thoracic aorta; left uterine tube; testicle / Top expressed in: hand; molar; foot; ventricular zone; maxillary prominence; endocardial cushion; mandibular prominence; medullary collecting duct; Gonadal ridge; genital tubercle; More reference expression data |
| BioGPS | n/a |
Gene ontology
| Molecular function | microtubule binding; microtubule motor activity; nucleotide binding; protein binding; ATP binding; plus-end-directed microtubule motor activity; ATPase activity |
| Cellular component | cell projection; ciliary tip; cilium; kinesin complex; ciliary basal body; cytoplasm; cytoskeleton; microtubule |
| Biological process | microtubule-based movement; negative regulation of smoothened signaling pathway; positive regulation of smoothened signaling pathway |
Sources:Amigo / QuickGO
Orthologs
| Databases | NCBI: entry; OMA: entry |
| Species | Human | Mouse |
| Entrez | 374654 | 16576 |
| Ensembl | ENSG00000166813 | ENSMUSG00000050382 |
| UniProt | Q2M1P5 | B7ZNG0 |
| RefSeq (mRNA) | NM_198525 | NM_001291222; NM_010626 |
| RefSeq (protein) | NP_940927 | n/a |
| Location (UCSC) | Chr 15: 89.61 – 89.66 Mb | Chr 7: 79.35 – 79.37 Mb |
| PubMed search |
- Wikidata
| View/Edit Human | View/Edit Mouse |

Kinesin family member 7 (KIF7), also known as kinesin-4, is a human protein encoded by the gene KIF7. It is part of the kinesin family of motor proteins.

== Function ==
KIF7 depolymerises the growing plus-end of microtubules, and is involved in regulating Hedgehog signalling.
