= Nephrocystin-4 =

Protein found in humans

NPHP4

Identifiers
- Aliases: NPHP4, POC10, SLSN4, nephronophthisis 4, nephrocystin 4
- External IDs: OMIM: 607215; MGI: 2384210; GeneCards: NPHP4

Gene location (Human)
Chr.	Chromosome 1 (human)
Band	1p36.31	Start	5,862,811 bp
Band	1p36.31	End	5,992,473 bp

Gene location (Mouse)
Chr.	Chromosome 4 (mouse)
Band	4|4 E2	Start	152,561,163 bp
Band	4|4 E2	End	152,647,640 bp
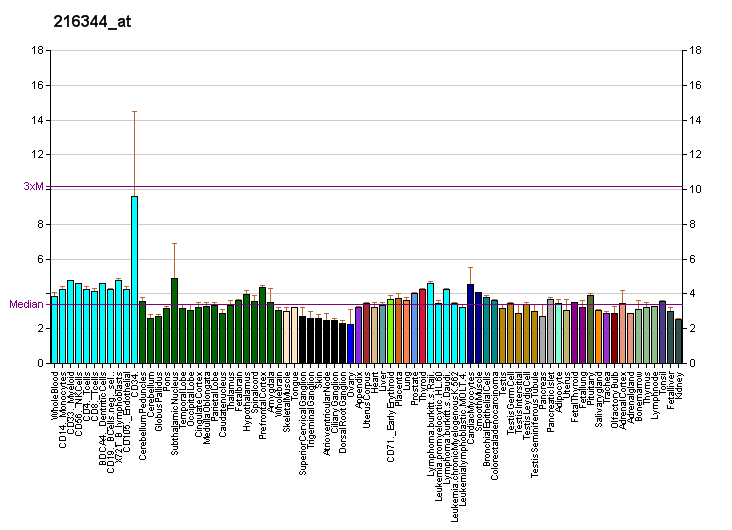

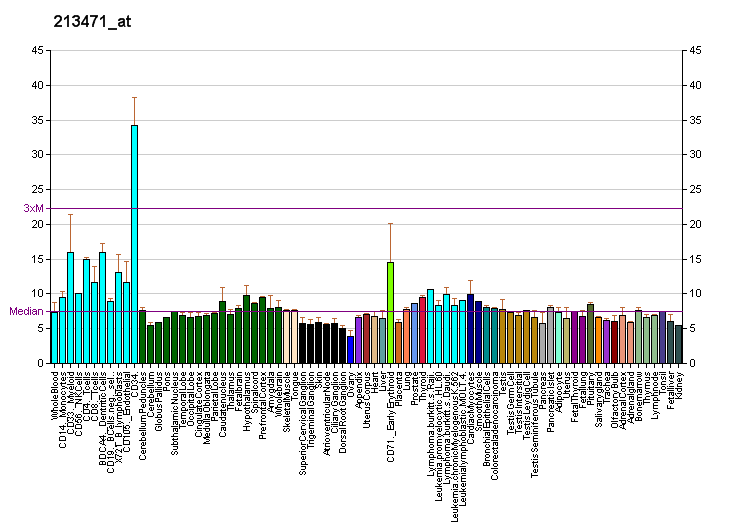
RNA expression pattern
Bgee	Human / Mouse (ortholog); Top expressed in: right uterine tube; anterior pituitary; right lobe of thyroid gland; left lobe of thyroid gland; right testis; left testis; skin of abdomen; right frontal lobe; skin of leg; stromal cell of endometrium / Top expressed in: lumbar subsegment of spinal cord; primary visual cortex; superior frontal gyrus; neural layer of retina; secondary oocyte; dentate gyrus of hippocampal formation granule cell; spermatocyte; olfactory tubercle; spermatid; prefrontal cortex; More reference expression data
BioGPS	More reference expression data
Gene ontology
Molecular function	structural molecule activity; protein binding
Cellular component	photoreceptor connecting cilium; ciliary transition zone; cytoplasm; ribbon synapse; microtubule organizing center; cell projection; cytosol; cell junction; cell-cell junction; ciliary base; centrosome; bicellular tight junction; cilium; cytoskeleton; nucleus; ciliary basal body; non-motile cilium
Biological process	retina development in camera-type eye; signal transduction; photoreceptor cell outer segment organization; visual behavior; actin cytoskeleton organization; photoreceptor cell maintenance; hippo signaling; flagellated sperm motility; positive regulation of bicellular tight junction assembly; negative regulation of canonical Wnt signaling pathway; ciliary basal body-plasma membrane docking; cell-cell adhesion; protein localization to ciliary transition zone
Sources:Amigo / QuickGO
Orthologs
Databases	NCBI: entry; OMA: entry
Species	Human	Mouse
Entrez	261734	260305
Ensembl	ENSG00000131697	ENSMUSG00000039577
UniProt	O75161	P59240
RefSeq (mRNA)	NM_001291593; NM_001291594; NM_015102	NM_153424; NM_001355738; NM_001355739
RefSeq (protein)	NP_001278522; NP_001278523; NP_055917	NP_700473; NP_001342667; NP_001342668
Location (UCSC)	Chr 1: 5.86 – 5.99 Mb	Chr 4: 152.56 – 152.65 Mb
PubMed search
- Wikidata
View/Edit Human	View/Edit Mouse

Nephrocystin-4 is a protein that in humans is encoded by the NPHP4 gene.

This gene encodes a protein which contains a proline-rich region. The encoded protein may function in renal tubular development and function.

This protein interacts with nephrocystin. Mutations in this gene are associated with nephronophthisis type 4. Multiple alternative transcript variants have been described but their full-length nature has not been determined.
