= Meckel–Gruber syndrome =

Meckel syndrome
- Other names: Meckel–Gruber syndrome, Gruber syndrome, Dysencephalia splanchnocystica
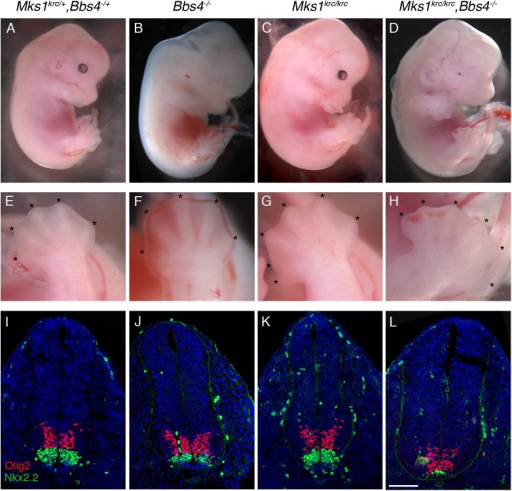
- Embryos with mutation in MKS1KRC, a cause of Meckel syndrome.
- Specialty: Medical genetics
- Frequency: 0.0001%
- Named after: Johann Meckel; Georg Gruber

Meckel-Gruber syndrome is a rare, lethal ciliopathic genetic disorder, characterized by renal cystic dysplasia, central nervous system malformations (occipital encephalocele), polydactyly (postaxial), hepatic developmental defects, and pulmonary hypoplasia due to oligohydramnios. Meckel–Gruber syndrome is named for Johann Meckel and Georg Gruber. The prognosis for infants born with Meckel-Gruber syndrome is poor, most being stillborn or dying within hours to days.

== Pathophysiology ==
Meckel–Gruber syndrome (MKS) is an autosomal recessive lethal malformation. Two MKS genes, MKS1 and MKS3, have been associated with the disorder. A study done recently has described the cellular, sub-cellular and functional characterization of the novel proteins, MKS1 and meckelin, encoded by these genes. The malfunction in the production of these proteins is mainly responsible for this lethal disorder.

Type	OMIM	Gene
MKS1	609883	MKS1
MKS2	603194	TMEM216
MKS3	607361	TMEM67
MKS4	611134	CEP290
MKS5	611561	RPGRIP1L
MKS6	612284	CC2D2A
MKS7	608002	NPHP3
MKS8	613846	TCTN2
MKS9	614144	B9D1
MKS10	611951	B9D2

=== Relation to other rare genetic disorders ===
Recent findings in genetic research have suggested that a large number phenotypically varying rare genetic disorders may share a common genotypical root cause. As Meckel–Gruber syndrome is a ciliopathy, it may be related to other known ciliopathies, such as primary ciliary dyskinesia, Bardet–Biedl syndrome, polycystic kidney and liver disease, nephronophthisis, Alström syndrome, and some forms of retinal degeneration. The MKS1 gene has been identified as being associated with ciliopathy.

== Diagnosis ==
Dysplastic kidneys are prevalent in over 95% of all identified cases. When this occurs, microscopic cysts develop within the kidney and slowly destroy it, causing it to enlarge up to 10 or 20 times its original size. The level of amniotic fluid within the womb may be significantly altered or remain normal, and a normal level of fluid should not be criteria for exclusion of diagnosis.

Occipital encephalocele is present in 60% to 80% of all cases, and postaxial polydactyly is present in 55% to 75% of the total number of identified cases. Bowing or shortening of the limbs are also common.

Finding at least two of the three phenotypic features of the classical triad in the presence of normal karyotype indicates a high likelihood of Meckel-Gruber Syndrome. Regular ultrasounds and proactive prenatal care can usually detect symptoms early on in pregnancy.

== Management ==
There is no cure for Meckel-Gruber syndrome. Treatment is limited to symptom management and palliative care.

== Prognosis ==
The disease is lethal. Most infants that are not stillborn with Meckel-Gruber syndrome die within hours to days of birth due to renal failure and lung hypoplasia. The longest survival time reported in medical literature is 28 months.

== Incidence ==
While not precisely known, it is estimated that the general rate of incidence, according to Bergsma, for Meckel-Gruber syndrome is 0.02 per 10,000 births. According to another study done six years later, the incidence rate could vary from 0.07 to 0.7 per 10,000 births.

This syndrome is a Finnish heritage disease. Its frequency is much higher in Finland, where the incidence is as high as 1.1 per 10,000 births. It is estimated that Meckel-Gruber syndrome accounts for 5% of all neural tube defects there. The Leicestershire Perinatal Mortality Survey for the years 1976 to 1982 had found high incidence of Meckel-Gruber syndrome in Gujarati Indian immigrants.
