= Nephrocystin-3 =

Protein found in humans

NPHP3

Identifiers
- Aliases: NPHP3, CFAP31, MKS7, NPH3, RHPD, RHPD1, SLSN3, nephronophthisis 3 (adolescent), nephrocystin 3
- External IDs: OMIM: 608002; MGI: 1921275; GeneCards: NPHP3

Gene location (Human)
Chr.	Chromosome 3 (human)
Band	3q22.1	Start	132,680,609 bp
Band	3q22.1	End	132,722,432 bp

Gene location (Mouse)
Chr.	Chromosome 9 (mouse)
Band	9 F1|9 56.11 cM	Start	103,879,743 bp
Band	9 F1|9 56.11 cM	End	103,921,017 bp
RNA expression pattern
Bgee	Human / Mouse (ortholog); Top expressed in: superficial temporal artery; synovial membrane; left ovary; thymus; right uterine tube; Achilles tendon; urethra; right ovary; canal of the cervix; mucosa of paranasal sinus / Top expressed in: ventricular zone; tail of embryo; genital tubercle; right kidney; superior frontal gyrus; primary visual cortex; zygote; embryo; yolk sac; embryo; More reference expression data
BioGPS	n/a
Gene ontology
Molecular function	protein binding
Cellular component	cell projection; cytosol; cilium; extracellular region
Biological process	Wnt signaling pathway; determination of liver left/right asymmetry; determination of pancreatic left/right asymmetry; lung development; atrial septum development; heart looping; convergent extension involved in gastrulation; ureter development; regulation of Wnt signaling pathway, planar cell polarity pathway; negative regulation of canonical Wnt signaling pathway; epithelial cilium movement involved in determination of left/right asymmetry; photoreceptor cell maintenance; determination of intestine left/right asymmetry; determination of stomach left/right asymmetry; regulation of planar cell polarity pathway involved in neural tube closure; kidney development; determination of left/right symmetry; maintenance of animal organ identity; cilium assembly; kidney morphogenesis
Sources:Amigo / QuickGO
Orthologs
Databases	NCBI: entry; OMA: entry
Species	Human	Mouse
Entrez	27031	74025
Ensembl	ENSG00000113971	ENSMUSG00000032558
UniProt	Q7Z494	Q7TNH6
RefSeq (mRNA)	NM_153240	NM_028721; NM_172460
RefSeq (protein)	NP_694972	NP_082997; NP_766048
Location (UCSC)	Chr 3: 132.68 – 132.72 Mb	Chr 9: 103.88 – 103.92 Mb
PubMed search
- Wikidata
View/Edit Human	View/Edit Mouse

Nephrocystin-3 is a protein that in humans is encoded by the NPHP3 gene.

This gene encodes a protein containing a coiled-coil (CC) domain, a tubulin-tyrosine ligase (TTL) domain, and a tetratrico peptide repeat (TPR) domain. The encoded protein interacts with nephrocystin and may function in renal tubular development and function. Mutations in this gene are associated with nephronophthisis type 3. Multiple splice variants have been described but their full-length nature has not been determined.

An association with renal-hepatic-pancreatic dysplasia has been described.
