= IQCB1 =

Protein-coding gene in the species Homo sapiens

Identifiers
- Aliases: IQCB1, NPHP5, PIQ, SLSN5, IQ motif containing B1
- External IDs: OMIM: 609237; MGI: 2443764; GeneCards: IQCB1

Gene location (Human)
Chr.	Chromosome 3 (human)
Band	3q13.33|3q21.1	Start	121,769,761 bp
Band	3q13.33|3q21.1	End	121,835,079 bp

Gene location (Mouse)
Chr.	Chromosome 16 (mouse)
Band	16|16 B3	Start	36,648,747 bp
Band	16|16 B3	End	36,693,083 bp
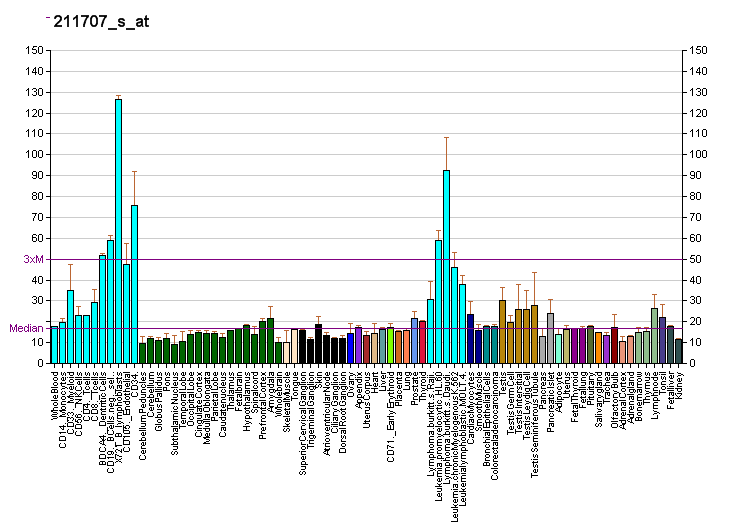

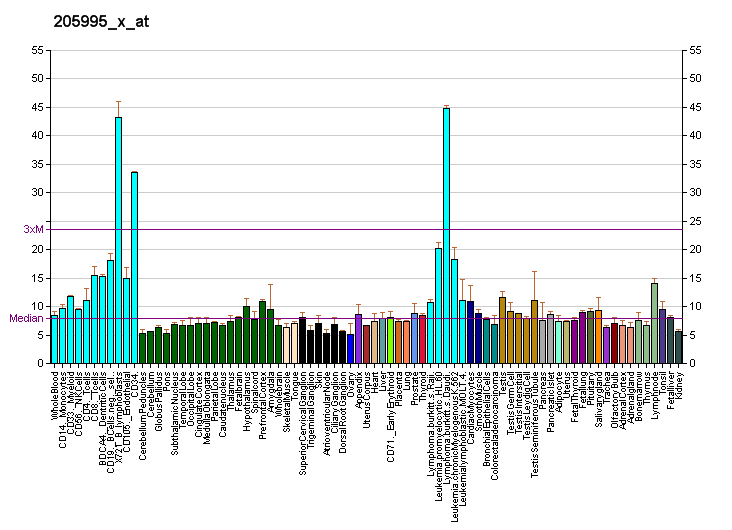
RNA expression pattern
Bgee	Human / Mouse (ortholog); Top expressed in: oocyte; epithelium of nasopharynx; testicle; monocyte; ventricular zone; body of pancreas; Achilles tendon; olfactory zone of nasal mucosa; rectum; bronchial epithelial cell / Top expressed in: neural layer of retina; genital tubercle; hand; zygote; spermatocyte; tail of embryo; dentate gyrus of hippocampal formation granule cell; neural tube; ventricular zone; secondary oocyte; More reference expression data
BioGPS	More reference expression data
Gene ontology
Molecular function	enzyme binding; protein binding; calmodulin binding
Cellular component	cytoplasm; microtubule organizing center; cytosol; centrosome; photoreceptor outer segment; extracellular exosome; cytoskeleton; photoreceptor connecting cilium; centriole; nucleoplasm; microtubule cytoskeleton; intercellular bridge; mitotic spindle
Biological process	photoreceptor cell maintenance; maintenance of animal organ identity; cell projection organization; cilium assembly; ciliary basal body-plasma membrane docking
Sources:Amigo / QuickGO
Orthologs
Databases	NCBI: entry; OMA: entry
Species	Human	Mouse
Entrez	9657	320299
Ensembl	ENSG00000173226	ENSMUSG00000022837
UniProt	Q15051	Q8BP00
RefSeq (mRNA)	NM_001023570; NM_001023571; NM_001319107; NM_014642	NM_177128
RefSeq (protein)	NP_001018864; NP_001018865; NP_001306036	NP_796102
Location (UCSC)	Chr 3: 121.77 – 121.84 Mb	Chr 16: 36.65 – 36.69 Mb
PubMed search
- Wikidata
View/Edit Human	View/Edit Mouse

IQ calmodulin-binding motif-containing protein 1 is a protein that in humans is encoded by the IQCB1 gene. This protein is involved in early cilia formation.

== Medical significance ==
Pathogenic mutations in IQCB1 are associated with a form of retinal dystrophy and blindness called Leber congenital amaurosis-10 (LCA10). Some people with pathogenic mutations not only have the symptoms of Leber congenital amaurosis, but also have nephronophthisis (kidney cysts/scarring), called Senior-Loken syndrome-5 (SLSN5)
