= Nephronophthisis =

Genetic disorder of the kidneys

- Nephronophthisis has an autosomal recessive pattern of inheritance.
- Specialty: Medical genetics
- Symptoms: Polyuria
- Types: Infantile, Juvenile and Adult NPH
- Diagnostic method: Renal ultrasound
- Treatment: Hypertension and anemia management

Nephronophthisis is a genetic disorder of the kidneys which affects children. It is classified as a medullary cystic kidney disease. The disorder is inherited in an autosomal recessive fashion and, although rare, is the most common genetic cause of childhood kidney failure. It is a form of ciliopathy. Its incidence has been estimated to be 0.9 cases per million people in the United States, and 1 in 50,000 births in Canada.

== Signs and symptoms ==
Infantile, juvenile, and adolescent forms of nephronophthisis have been identified. Although the range of characterizations is broad, people affected by nephronophthisis typically present with polyuria (production of a large volume of urine), polydipsia (excessive liquid intake), and after several months to years, end-stage kidney disease, a condition necessitating either dialysis or a kidney transplant in order to survive. Some individuals with nephronophthisis also have so-called "extra-renal symptoms" which can include tapetoretinal degeneration, liver problems, oculomotor apraxia, and cone-shaped epiphysis (Saldino-Mainzer syndrome).

== Cause ==
Nephronophthisis is characterized by fibrosis and the formation of cysts at the cortico-medullary junction, it is an autosomal recessive disorder which eventually leads to terminal kidney failure.

== Pathophysiology ==
Ciliopathy (eukaryotic cilium diagram)

Mechanism of nephronophthisis indicates that all proteins mutated in cystic kidney diseases express themselves in primary cilia. NPHP gene mutations cause defects in signaling resulting in flaws of planar cell polarity. The ciliary theory indicates that multiple organs are involved in NPHP (retinal degeneration, cerebellar hypoplasia, liver fibrosis, and intellectual disability).

=== Related rare genetic disorders ===
Nephronophthisis is a ciliopathy. Other known ciliopathies include primary ciliary dyskinesia, Bardet–Biedl syndrome, polycystic kidney and liver disease, Alström syndrome, Meckel–Gruber syndrome and some forms of retinal degeneration.

NPHP2 is an infantile type of nephronophthisis and sometimes associated with situs inversus this can be explained by its relation with inversin gene. NPHP1, NPHP3, NPHP4, NPHP5, and NPHP6 are sometimes seen with retinitis pigmentosa, this particular association has a name, Senior-Loken syndrome.

== Diagnosis ==
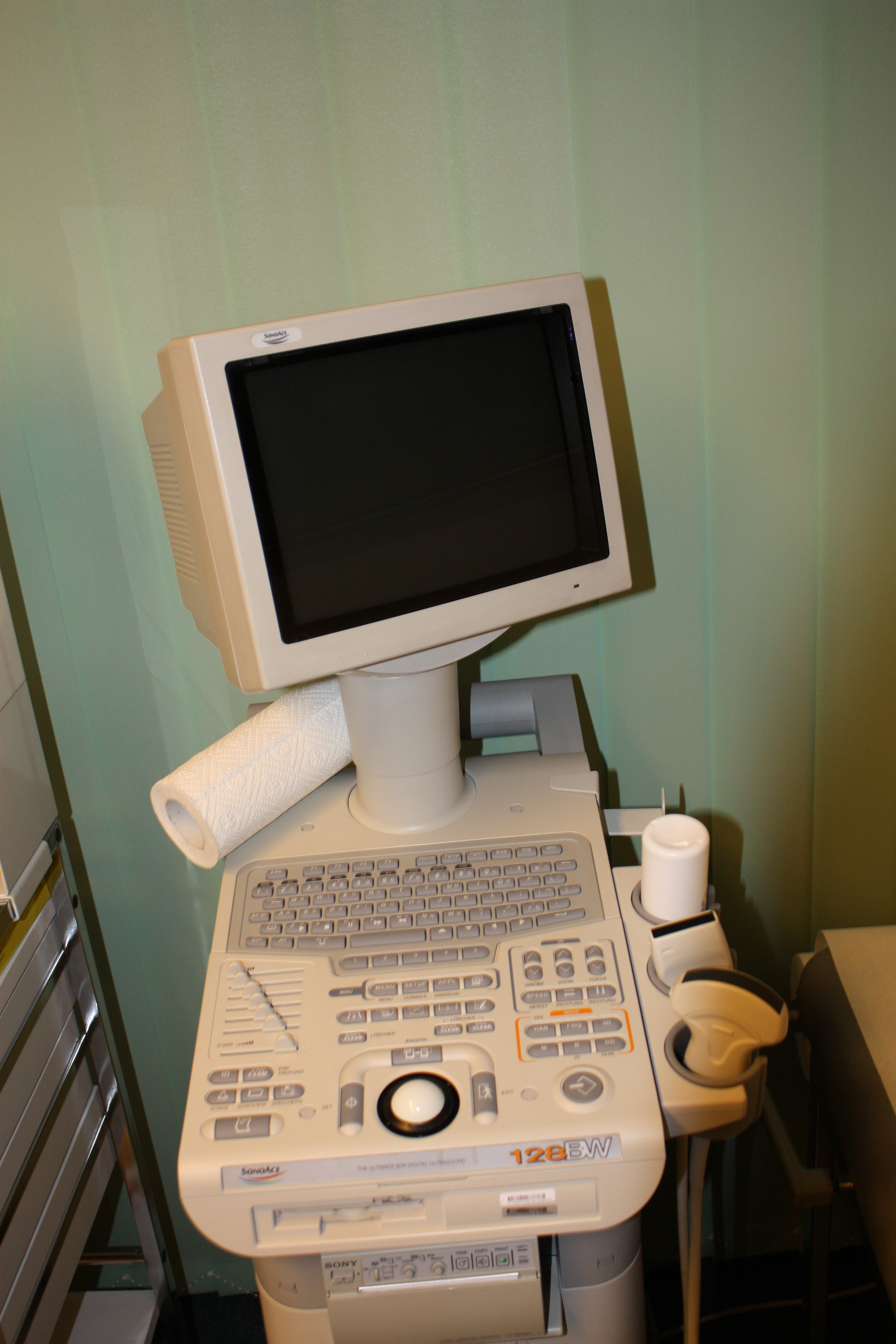
Ultrasound

The diagnosis of nephronophthisis can be obtained via a kidney ultrasound, family history and clinical history of the affected individual according to Stockman, et al.

=== Types ===
- Infantile NPH
- Juvenile NPH
- Adult NPH

== Management ==
The management of this condition can be done via-improvement of any electrolyte imbalance, as well as, high blood pressure and low red blood cell counts (anemia) treatment as the individual's condition warrants.

== Epidemiology ==
Nephronophthisis occurs equally in both sexes and has an estimate 9 in about 8 million rate in individuals. Nephronophthisis is the leading monogenic cause of end-stage kidney disease in the first three decades of life.
