= Potter sequence =

Abnormal appearance of a baby due to amniotic deficiency in the uterus

- Other names: Potter's syndrome, Potter's sequence, oligohydramnios sequence
- Specialty: Medical genetics

Potter sequence is the atypical physical appearance of a baby due to oligohydramnios experienced when in the uterus. It includes clubbed feet, pulmonary hypoplasia and cranial anomalies related to the oligohydramnios. Oligohydramnios is the decrease in amniotic fluid volume sufficient to cause deformations in morphogenesis of the baby.

Oligohydramnios is the cause of Potter sequence, but there are many things that can lead to oligohydramnios. It can be caused by renal diseases such as bilateral renal agenesis (BRA), atresia of the ureter or urethra causing obstruction of the urinary tract, polycystic or multicystic kidney diseases, renal hypoplasia, amniotic rupture, toxemia, or uteroplacental insufficiency from maternal hypertension.

The term Potter sequence was initially intended to only refer to cases caused by BRA; however, it is now commonly used by many clinicians and researchers to refer to any case that presents with oligohydramnios or anhydramnios regardless of the source of the loss of amniotic fluid.

== Types ==
Since its initial characterization, Potter sequence has been defined into five distinct subclassifications. There are those in the medical and research fields that use the term Potter sequence to specifically refer to only cases of BRA, while other groups use the term to loosely refer to all instances of oligohydramnios and anhydramnios regardless of the specific cause. The assignment of nomenclature to the various causes (types) was employed in order to help clarify these discrepancies, but these subclassifications and nomenclature system have not caught on in the medical and research communities.

Type	OMIM	Description
Classic form	n/a	This term is traditionally used when the infant has bilateral renal agenesis (BRA), meaning that kidneys do not develop (malformation of the ureteric bud). True BRA also presents with bilateral agenesis of the ureters. After the creation of the nomenclature system for this sequence, BRA was recognized as possibly being an extreme variation of Potter sequence II. However, some clinicians and researchers still use the term classic Potter sequence so as to emphasize that they are specifically referring to cases of BRA and not another form.
Type I	263200	Type I is due to autosomal recessive polycystic kidney disease (ARPKD), which occurs at a frequency of approximately one in 16,000 infants. The kidneys of the fetus/neonate will be enlarged, have many small cysts filled with fluid, and will fail to produce an adequate volume of fetal urine. The liver and pancreas of the fetus may also show fibrosis and/or a cystic change.
Type II	191830	Type II is usually due to renal agenesis, which can also fall under the category known as hereditary urogenital adysplasia or hereditary renal adysplasia (HRA). This is characterized by the complete agenesis or absence of one kidney and the remaining solitary kidney being small and malformed. Bilateral renal agenesis is believed to be the most extreme phenotypic variation of HRA. However, BRA is often referred to as classic Potter sequence, as it was this particular phenotype of neonates and fetuses that Potter originally reported in her 1946 manuscripts when characterizing this birth defect.
Type III	173900	Type III is due to autosomal dominant polycystic kidney disease (ADPKD) linked to mutations in the genes PKD1 and PKD2. While ADPKD is considered to be an adult-onset polycystic kidney disease, it can also present in the fetus and neonate in rare cases. Like ARPKD, ADPKD can also present with hepatic cysts and an enlarged spleen. An increased prevalence of vascular disease is also observed in these cases of ADPKD.
Type IV	n/a	Type IV occurs when a longstanding obstruction in either the kidney or ureter leads to cystic kidneys or hydronephrosis. This can be due to chance, environment, or genetics. While these types of obstructions occur frequently in fetuses, they rarely tend to lead to fetal demise.
Others	143400	Often cystic kidneys that do not fall under the classification of being polycystic will be termed as being multicystic renal dysplasia (MRD). Recently many cases of MRD have been linked to the mutations in the gene TBX18, however, this new possible genetic cause has not been assigned a Potter sequence nomenclature number. Another cause of Potter sequence (oligohydramnios or anhydramnios—little or no amniotic fluid) can be the rupturing of the amniotic sacs that contain the amniotic fluid of the fetus. This can happen spontaneously, by chance, environment, maternal trauma and, in rare cases, maternal genetics.

== Signs and symptoms ==
The failure of the metanephros to develop in cases of BRA and some cases involving unilateral renal agenesis (URA) is due primarily to the failure of the mesonephric duct to produce a ureteric bud capable of inducing the metanephric mesenchyme. The failed induction will thereby cause the subsequent degeneration of the metanephros by apoptosis and other mechanisms. The mesonephric duct(s) of the agenic kidney(s) will also degenerate and fail to connect with the bladder. Therefore, the means by which the fetus produces urine and transports it to the bladder for excretion into the amniotic sac has been severely compromised (in the cases of URA), or completely eliminated (in the cases of BRA). The decreased volume of amniotic fluid causes the growing fetus to become compressed by the mother's uterus. This compression can cause many physical deformities of the fetus, most common of which is Potter facies. Lower extremity anomalies are frequent in these cases, which often present with clubbed feet and/or bowing of the legs. Sirenomelia, or "Mermaid syndrome" (which occurs approximately in 1:45,000 births) can also present. In fact, nearly all reported cases of sirenomelia also present with BRA.It is associated with childhood polycystic kidney disease which is autosomal recessive in origin

Other anomalies of the classic Potter sequence infant include a parrot beak nose, redundant skin, and the most common characteristic of infants with BRA which is a skin fold of tissue extending from the medial canthus across the cheek. The ears are slightly low and pressed against the head making them appear large. The adrenal glands often appear as small oval discs pressed against the posterior abdomen due to the absence of upward renal pressure. The bladder is often small, nondistensible and may be filled with a minute amount of fluid. In males the vas deferens and seminal vesicles may be absent, while in females the uterus and upper vagina may be absent. Other abnormalities include anal atresia, absence of the rectum and sigmoid colon, esophageal and duodenal atresia, and a single umbilical artery. Presence of a diaphragmatic hernia is also common in these fetuses/infants. Additionally, the alveolar sacs of the lungs fail to properly develop as a result of the reduced volume of amniotic fluid. Labor is often induced between 22 and 36 weeks of gestation (however, some of these pregnancies may go to term) and unaborted infants typically survive for only a few minutes to a few hours. These infants will eventually die as either a result of pulmonary hypoplasia or renal failure.

== Causes ==
The Potter sequence is due to restricted ability for certain organs to grow due to severe oligohydramnios.

In one study, the causes leading to Potter sequence were bilateral renal agenesis in 21.25% of cases; cystic dysplasia in 47.5%; obstructive uropathy in 25%; and others in 5.25%.

=== Bilateral renal agenesis ===
Bilateral renal agenesis has been estimated to occur at a frequency of approximately 1:4000 to 1:8000 fetuses and neonates. However, recent analysis has estimated that the condition may occur at a much greater frequency. The condition has been reported to occur twice as commonly in males as in females, suggesting that certain genes of the Y chromosome may act as modifiers. However, no candidate genes on the Y chromosome have yet been identified.

BRA appears to have a predominantly genetic etiology and many cases represent the most severe manifestation of an autosomal dominant condition with incomplete penetrance and variable expressivity. There are several genetic pathways that could result in this condition. In 2017 researchers identified heritable autosomal dominant mutations in the gene GREB1L in two unrelated families as being the cause of both BRA and URA utilizing exome sequencing and direct sequence analysis. This is the first reported genetic lesion implicated in the activation of retinoic acid receptor (RAR) targets that has been associated with renal agenesis in humans. The majority of other possible candidate genetic pathways are autosomal recessive in nature and do not coincide with the frequency or penetrance at which BRA typically occurs in the human population. Additionally, candidate genetic pathways would be expected to involve genes expressed in the developing urogenital system (UGS). Often, these same genes and/or pathways of interacting genes are also expressed in the developing UGS as well as the central nervous system (CNS), gut, lung, limbs, and eyes.

== Pathogenesis ==
Development of the mature kidney begins between weeks 5 and 7 of gestation. Fetal urine production begins in early gestation and comprises the majority of the amniotic fluid in the second and third trimesters of pregnancy. The fetus continuously swallows amniotic fluid, which is reabsorbed by the gastrointestinal tract and then reintroduced into the amniotic cavity by the kidneys via urination. Oligohydramnios occurs if the volume of amniotic fluid is less than normal for the corresponding period of gestation. The fetal urine is critical to the proper development of the lungs by aiding in the expansion of the airways (alveoli) by means of hydrodynamic pressure and by also supplying proline which is a critical amino acid for lung development. Alveoli are the small sacs in the lungs that exchange oxygen with the blood. If the alveoli, and thereby the lungs, are underdeveloped at the time of birth the infant will not be able to breathe air properly and will go into respiratory distress shortly after birth due to pulmonary hypoplasia (underdeveloped lungs). This is the primary cause of death to Potter sequence infants secondary to renal failure. The fetal urine also serves to cushion the fetus from being compressed by the mother's uterus as it grows.

== Prognosis ==
The outcome of Potter's Sequence is poor. A series of 23 patients in 2007 recorded 7 deaths, 4 in the neonatal period. All 16 survivors have chronic kidney disease, with half developing end stage renal failure (median age 0.3 years, range 2 days to 8.3 years). Survivors had growth impairment (44%) and cognitive and motor development delay (25%)

The first child to survive bilateral renal agenesis (BRA), Abigail Rose Herrera Beutler, was born in July 2013 to US Congresswoman Jaime Herrera Beutler. A few weeks before she was born, Dr. Jessica Bienstock, a professor of maternal–fetal medicine at Johns Hopkins Hospital, administered a series of saline solution injections into the mother's womb to help the baby's lungs to develop. After Abigail was born, the procedure was considered a success. The infant did not need artificial respiration and could breathe on her own. Her parents kept her on at-home kidney dialysis until she was old enough for a kidney transplant. On February 8, 2016, at the age of two, Abigail received a kidney from her father at the Lucile Packard Children's Hospital Stanford in California.

== History ==
Bilateral renal agenesis (BRA) was first recognized as a defect of human fetal development in 1671 by Wolfstrigel.

In 1946, Edith Potter (1901–1993) described a series of 20 cases with absent kidneys, noting the characteristic appearance of the head and lungs. Up until this time, the condition itself was considered to be extremely rare. However, due in part to Potter's work, it has come to light that the condition presents far more frequently than previously reported. Potter analyzed approximately 5000 autopsy cases performed on fetuses and newborn infants over a period of ten years and found that 20 of these infants presented with BRA, all of which had distinctive facial characteristics which did not appear to have any specific embryologic correlation with the renal anomaly. It was only much later that she and others were to attribute the multiple congenital deformities, including the features of Potter's facies and also pulmonary hypoplasia, to the prolonged lack of amniotic fluid. These facial characteristics have subsequently been referred to as Potter facies. From her analysis, she was able to deduce the sequence of events that leads to what is now known as Potter sequence.

Potter went on to become a pioneer in the field of human renal development; her contributions are still employed and appreciated by clinicians and researchers to the present time.

== Terminology ==
Potter syndrome is not technically a syndrome as it does not collectively present with the same telltale characteristics and symptoms in each and every case. It is more accurately described as a "sequence" or chain of events that may have different beginnings (absent kidneys, cystic kidneys, obstructed ureters or other causes), but which all end with the same conclusion (absent or reduced volume of amniotic fluid). This is why Potter syndrome is often called Potter sequence or oligohydramnios sequence by some clinicians and researchers. The term Potter syndrome is most frequently associated with the condition of oligohydramnios sequence regardless of the root cause of the absence or reduced volume of amniotic fluid. However, as noted in this article, the term Potter syndrome was initially coined in order to refer to fetuses and infants with BRA. It was not until later that the term became more encompassing as it was noted that other causes of failed fetal urine production also resulted in similar physical characteristics and prognoses of the fetuses and infants with BRA (that which Potter originally described in 1946). Since then, the term Potter syndrome has become a misnomer and experts have attempted not to eliminate the terminology, but to modify it in a way so as to be able to determine the different root causes by creating a nomenclature system. However, this classification system has not caught on in the clinical and research fields.

== See also ==
- Kidney development
