= TRPP =

Family of transport proteins

TRPP (transient receptor potential polycystic) is a family of transient receptor potential ion channels which when mutated can cause polycystic kidney disease.

== Subcategories ==
TRPP subunits can be divided into two subcategories depending on structural similarity.

=== Polycystic Kidney Disease 1 (PKD1)-Like Group ===
The first group, polycystic kidney disease 1 (PKD1)-like, contains polycystin-1 (Previously known as TRPP1), PKDREJ, PKD1L1, PKD1L2, and PKD1L3. Polycystin-1 contains numerous N-terminal adhesive domains that are important for cell-cell contact. This group of subunits also contain a large extracellular domain with numerous polycystin motifs. These motifs are of unknown function and are located between the S6 and S7 segments. The large intracellular C-terminal segment of TRPP1 seems to interact with TRPP2 to act as a signaling complex.

=== Polycystic Kidney Disease 2 (PKD2)-Like Group ===
This group of PKD2-like members (previously known as TRPP2-like) are: PKD2 (previously known as TRPP2), PKD2L1 (previously known as TRPP3), and PKD2L2 (previously known as TRPP5). Unlike the previous group, which contain 11 membrane-spanning segments, this group resemble other TRP channels, having 6 membrane-spanning segments with intracellular N- and C-termini. All of the members of this group contain a coiled coil region in their C-terminus involved in the interaction with the polycystin-1 group. PKD2 and PKD2L1 form constitutively active cation-selective ion channels that are permeable to calcium. PKD2L1 has also been implicated in sour taste perception. Coupling of PKD2 and PKD1 recruits PKD1 to the membrane. Here, its activity is decreased and it suppresses the activation of G proteins by PKD1.

== Genes ==
- Group 1: polycystic kidney disease 1 (PKD1) like proteins
  - PKD1
  - PKDREJ
  - PKD1L1
  - PKD1L2
  - PKD1L3
- Group 2: polycystic kidney disease 2 (PKD2) like proteins
  - PKD2
  - PKD2L1
  - PKD2L2

== See also ==
- Polycystic kidney disease
