= Polycystic kidney disease 3 (autosomal dominant) =

Protein in humans

PKD3

Identifiers
- Aliases: PKD3, polycystic kidney disease 3 (autosomal dominant)
- External IDs: GeneCards: PKD3
Orthologs
Databases	NCBI: entry
Species	Human	Mouse
Entrez	5312	n/a
Ensembl	n/a	n/a
UniProt	n a	n/a
RefSeq (mRNA)	n/a	n/a
RefSeq (protein)	n/a	n/a
Location (UCSC)	n/a	n/a
PubMed search		n/a
- Wikidata
View/Edit Human

Polycystic kidney disease 3 (autosomal dominant) is a protein encoded by the PKD3 gene in humans.

Polycystic kidney disease (ADPKD) is a life threatening hereditary disorder characterized by the development and expansion of fluid-filled cysts on the kidney and other organs. It is an autosomal dominant disease, and it is one of the most common hereditary disorders with an occurrence rate of approximately 1 in 1000.

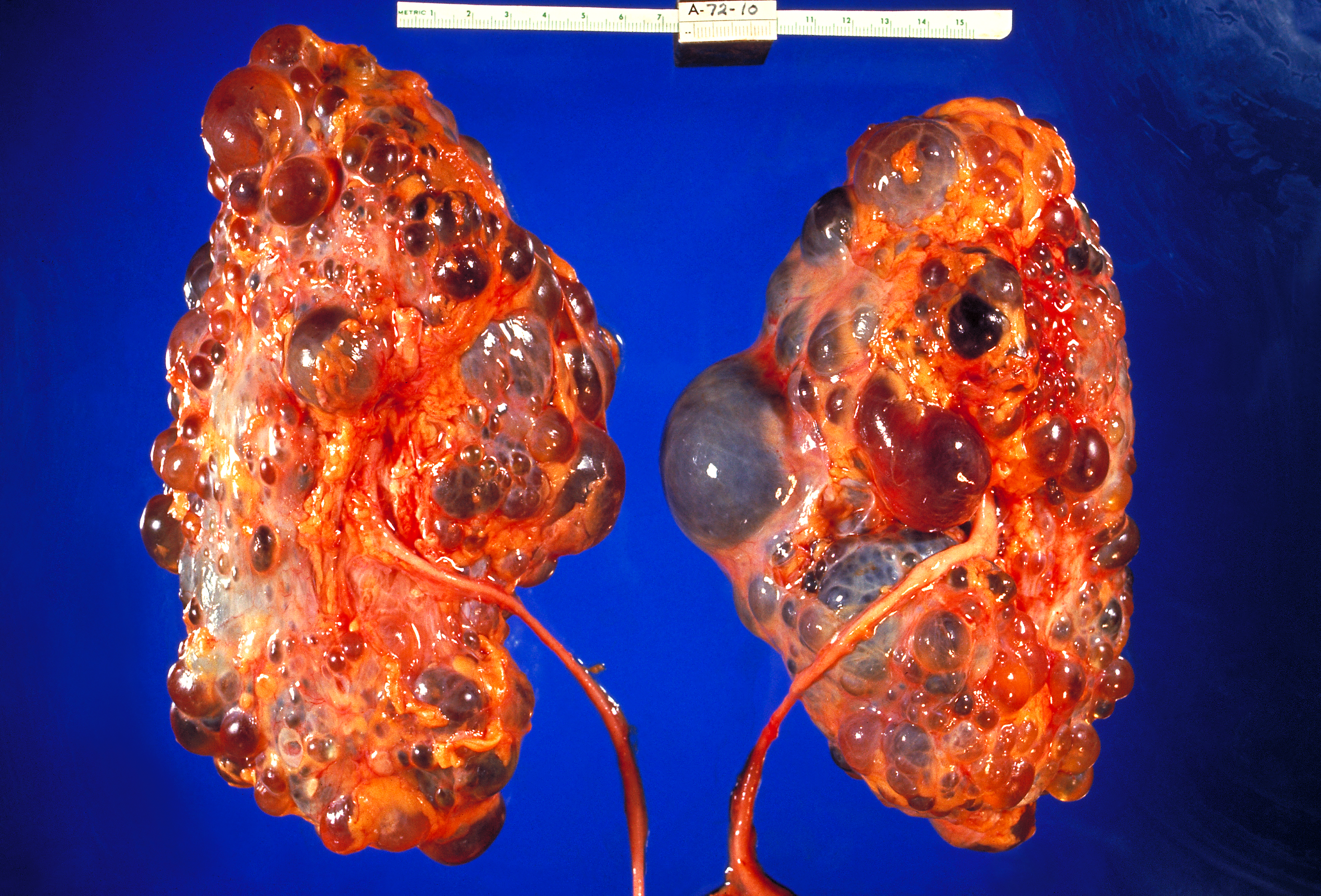
The image shows a polycystic kidney disease, caused by mutation in the GANAB gene.

== Characteristics ==
ADPKD is an autosomal dominant disease, classified into three types, with the chromosomal location of the responsible gene in parentheses: PKD1 (16 Chr), PKD2 (4 Chr), and PKD3 (11 Chr). Mutations in any of the three different genes PKD1, PKD2, and PKD3 cause similar disorders. The PKD3 gene is located on chromosome number 11q12.3; the phenotype MIM number is 600666.

PKD3 disease is the result of a mutation in the GANAB gene. The GANAB gene encodes the alpha subunit of glucosidase II and a member of the glycosyl hydrolase 31 family of proteins. The heterodimeric enzyme glucosidase II plays a role in protein folding and quality control by cleaving glucose residues from immature glycoproteins in the endoplasmic reticulum. The expression of the protein is elevated in lung tumor tissue. Any mutation in this gene causes autosomal dominant polycystic kidney and liver disease.

PKD3 is an autosomal dominant inheritance gene that leads to renal cysts and is related to liver cysts that sometimes causes organ dysfunction. It is usually detected in middle to late aged individuals who develop severe cysts in the kidneys and liver. However, the renal disease is mild and very few patients have hypertension. Unlike the liver disease, which develops a wide spectrum of severity, some individuals with the PKD3 gene develop no kidney cysts.

== Clinical features ==
In an analysis of 20 patients from nine unrelated families who developed PKD with heterozygous mutations in the GANAB gene, five mutations in the GANAB gene were predicted to result in a short protein (frameshift, nonsense, or splicing) and three variants to result in missense mutations. Seven of the families had a diagnosis of PKD, while the other two families had a diagnosis of polycystic liver disease (PCLD). Most of the patients' diseases developed during adulthood, except one patient who showed symptoms at 9 years old. The medical records indicated that the level of renal disease was insignificant and very few of the patients had high blood pressure. Renal imaging presented variable numbers of multiple cysts (from less than 10 to more than 40). Of those suffering from PCLD, some had no cysts while others developed severe disease, requiring surgery. This study shows that GANAB-related PKD and PCLD are not necessarily separate diseases, that there was significant phenotypic overlap, and that PKD3 is responsible for this disease.

== Treatment ==
There is no specific treatment for PKD3. However, research is ongoing for treatment to minimize the symptoms. Regular monitoring and following up on the complications of this disease can assist in maintaining the health of the individual and extend their life span. Recent research shows that treatment with protein kinase C (PKC) inhibitors prevented the increase in PKD3 activity induced by constitutively active Rac (V12; RacV12) and aluminum fluoride Galpha12/13.

== Mechanism ==
- Both Galpha12/13 and Rac are important components in the signal transduction pathways that mediate bombesin receptor-induced PKD3 activation.
- The addition of aluminum fluoride to COS-7 cells co-transfected with PKD3 and Galpha13/12 leads to PKD3 activation. This is related to a transient plasma membrane translocation of cytosolic PKD3.
- The catalytic domain of PKD3 can localize to the nucleus when expressed without the kinase domain. Moreover, the catalytic activation of PKD3 in response to RacV12, Galpha12/13 signaling, and bombesin correlated with Ser-731/735 phosphorylation in the activation loop of this enzyme.
