= Ectasia =

Medical condition

In medicine and physiology, ectasia (/ɛkˈteɪʒə/), also called ectasis (/ˈɛktəsɪs/), is dilation or distention of a hollow or tubular structure, either normal or pathophysiologic but usually the latter (except in atelectasis, where absence of ectasis is the problem).

In typography, the term is not a standard technical term, but it can be understood as the expansion, stretching, or widening of a letterform, glyph, or text block.

== Specific conditions ==
- Bronchiectasis, chronic dilatation of the bronchi.
- Duct ectasia of breast, a dilated milk duct. Duct ectasia syndrome is a synonym for nonpuerperal (unrelated to pregnancy and breastfeeding) mastitis.
- Dural ectasia, dilation of the dural sac surrounding the spinal cord, usually in the very low back.
- Pyelectasis, dilation of a part of the kidney, most frequently seen in prenatal ultrasounds. It usually resolves on its own.
- Rete tubular ectasia, dilation of tubular structures in the testicles. It is usually found in older men.
- Corneal ectasia (secondary keratoconus), a bulging of the cornea.

Vascular ectasias

- Most broadly, any abnormal dilatation of a blood vessel, including aneurysms.
- Annuloaortic ectasia, dilation of the aorta. It can be associated with Marfan syndrome.
- Dolichoectasias, weakening of arteries, usually caused by high blood pressure.
- Intracranial dolichoectasias, dilation of arteries inside the head.
- Gastric antral vascular ectasia, dilation of small blood vessels in the last part of the stomach.
- Telangiectasias are small dilated blood vessels found anywhere on the body, but commonly seen on the face around the nose, cheeks, and chin.
- Venous ectasia, dilation of veins or venules, such as:
  - Chronic venous insufficiency, often in the leg
  - Jugular vein ectasia, in the jugular veins returning blood from the head
