= Glomerulocystic kidney disease =

- Specialty: Nephrology

Glomerulocystic kidney disease (GCKD) is a cystic disorder of the kidneys. GCKD involves cystic dilation of Bowman's capsule. It can occur with or without congenital abnormality.

Glomerulocystic kidney disease (GCKD) is a renal cystic disease that can be classified in five major groups including familial, familial/sporadic heritable, glomerulocystic kidneys as a component of other cystic disease, sporadic, and acquired. The direct mechanism is not well researched but the main symptom is dilated or enlarged Bowman's capsule with glomerular cysts. The cysts are mostly located on the subscapular area of the renal cortex. Symptoms can vary in each case particularly between age groups. CT and MRI tests are recommended to differentiate and diagnose GCKD. Recovery includes medication to manage hypertensivity, diabetes, and surgery if necessary. Further research must be done to find the direct cause and best treatment plans. There are no alternate names for this disease but it is often misdiagnosed as other related kidney diseases.

== Signs and symptoms ==
- Dilation of Bowman's space in the plane section of two to three fold of normal
- Kidneys can be described as hypoplastic: meaning kidney have some abnormalities
- Size of kidneys can be normal or greatly enlarged depending on the individual case
- Transcriptional reprogramming: the expression of some genes is elevated and other genes are repressed during transcription
- Changes in cilia length
- Cysts in kidneys can be diffuse or clustered and uneven in development
- Blood vessels can show fibrointimal hyperplasia and luminal narrowing: meaning a layer of the blood vessel called tunica intima may thicken and the blood vessels will have a smaller opening
- Glomerular tufts collapsed or reduced: can also be described as the network of capillaries in the glomerulus that are the beginning of blood filtration
- Tubular obstruction possible

There is variation in signs and symptoms depending on the age of onset for GCKD:

- Cases in neonates or newborn children can present with hypertension, abdominal masses, early onset diabetes, and variable degrees of renal failure also known as kidney failure
- Cases in adults can present with flank pain or upper abdomen discomfort, hematuria, and hypertension/high blood pressure

== Cause ==
Glomerulocystic kidney disease can be inherited by autosomal dominant inheritance, develop due to urinary tract obstruction, manifest in cell proliferation during organogenesis, and develop through other related kidney diseases. Familial heritable GCKD can be inherited by offspring through adults which can cause GCKD in children or babies.

Medical associations related to main cause: GCKD can be associated with autosomal dominant polycystic kidney disease. It can also be found in a number of patients with the following:

- Tuberous sclerosis complex
- medullary cystic kidney disease
- Jeune syndrome
- Nephronophthisis
- Meckel–Gruber syndrome
- Orofaciodigital syndrome
- Zellweger syndrome

In addition, GCKD can be a component of renal dysplasia after fetal renal damage such as drug use by the mother.

== Mechanism/pathophysiology ==
The mechanism of cyst formation in glomerulocystic kidney disease is not well understood. There is speculated to be a connection to HNF-1ß in familial GCKD which is critical in the development of the kidney, pancreas, and liver. Mutations in the HNF-1ß gene are a cause of renal cystic kidney disease and early onset diabetes However, in nonfamilial GCKD, HNF-1ß may not have a role.

There are a variable amount of glomeruli with dilated Bowman's capsules within patients with GCKD. Tufts of the glomerulus attached to the walls of the capillaries have the possibility to be collapsed or shrunk. The epithelia in the wall of the capsule are also flattened. The enlargement of the kidney can be related to the degree of cyst formation. The cysts which come from the Bowmans space can also cause the kidneys to appear asymmetrical or misshapen. Cysts can cause injury by destroying nearby renal tissue

Familial GCKD can have enlarged or normal size kidneys. Early onset seen in infants can be accompanied with severe renal insufficiency while in adulthood the renal damage can be less severe.

== Diagnosis ==
There must be a differential diagnosis done for GCKD because it can appear so similar to other kidney disease. To differentiate it from autosomal recessive polycystic disease it is found there is abnormal medullary pyramids in autosomal recessive polycystic kidney disease but not GCKD. Imaging of small renal cysts with sub scapular distribution also help to separate it from other diseases. In ADPKD cysts can be observed in the cortex and medulla, while GCKD they just present in the cortex. Diagnosis for GCKD can be confirmed if 5 percent or more of glomeruli are cystic.

CT scans are one way to test but are not able to make distinctions between other diseases. MRI's are recommended because they are able to make definitive diagnosis of GCKD. Ultra sonographs can also be useful. A biopsy may also help differentiate from other cysts because in GCKD there will be tubular and glomerular atrophy, and interstitial fibrosis.

Family history of various kidney diseases and related medical associations may also be an indicator of GCKD and help with the diagnosis.

== Treatment ==
There are various treatment methods available and they vary case to case.

Below are the known treatment methods at this time:

- Anti-hypertensive drug: used to treat the high blood pressure
- Diabetes management (if applicable): which involves exercising regularly, eating right, and keeping track of ones numbers
- Surgery, if necessary because of anatomical abnormality, and to drain cysts
- Diet changes to reduce the amount of phosphate, protein, sodium, acid, and sugar intake
- Blood pressure medication
- Dialysis can help to support the damaged kidney if the case is severe enough
- Other treatment methods are unknown at this time

== Prognosis ==
There are no specific studies done on Life Expectancy or statistical information for the prognosis of GCKD. For other kidneys diseases depending on degree the prognosis is generally positive. Life span may be shortened but that has not been proven.

Most likely patients with GCKD will be on close watch and have a regimented diet.

== Epidemiology ==
GCKD is rare and there have not been many cases reported. Age of onset can happen anytime although it is more common in infants and young children. For most chronic kidney disease cases, women live longer than men.

== Research directions ==
There is much need for further research in many aspects of GCKD. Specific mechanism and physiology for development of the disease needs more clarity. The developmental genes with roles in GCKD must be clarified. Treatment plans need to be tested and implemented specifically for GCKD. More statistics need to be collected as this emerging disease becomes more well known.
