= Cystic kidney disease =

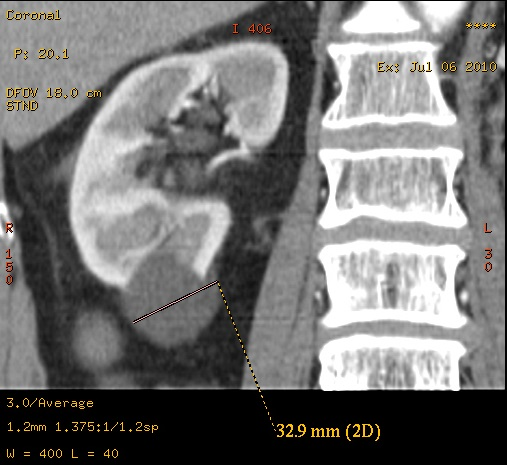
- Renal cyst
- Specialty: Medical genetics

Cystic kidney disease refers to a wide range of hereditary, developmental, and acquired conditions and with the inclusion of neoplasms with cystic changes, over 40 classifications and subtypes have been identified. Depending on the disease classification, the presentation may be at birth, or much later into adult life. Cystic disease may involve one or both kidneys and may, or may not, occur in the presence of other anomalies. A higher incidence is found in males and prevalence increases with age. Renal cysts have been reported in more than 50% of patients over the age of 50. Typically, cysts grow up to 2.88 mm annually and may cause related pain and/or hemorrhage.

Of the cystic kidney diseases, the most common is polycystic kidney disease with two sub-types: the less prevalent autosomal recessive and more prevalent autosomal dominant. Autosomal recessive polycystic kidney disease (ARPKD) is primarily diagnosed in infants and young children while autosomal dominant polycystic kidney disease (ADPKD) is most often diagnosed in adulthood.

Another example of cystic kidney disease is Medullary sponge kidney.

== Types ==
=== More cystic kidney diseases ===
Cystic kidney disease includes various conditions related to the formation of cysts in one or both kidneys. The most common subset is polycystic kidney disease (PKD), which is a genetic anomaly with two subsets, autosomal recessive polycystic kidney disease (ARPKD) and autosomal dominant polycystic kidney disease (ADPKD). Consequently, causation can be genetic, developmental, or associated with systemic disease which can be acquired or malignant. Examples of acquired cystic kidney disease include simple cysts and medullary sponge kidney (MSK). Other types of genetic cystic kidney disease include juvenile nephronophthisis (JNPHP), medullary cystic kidney disease (MCKD), and glomerulocystic kidney disease (GCKD).

=== Polycystic kidney disease ===
PKD causes numerous cysts to grow in the kidneys. These cysts are filled with fluid and if they grow excessively, changing the shape of them and making them larger, leading to kidney damage. Mutations in genes PKD1 and PKD2 are responsible for autosomal dominant polycystic kidney disease (ADPKD), which is typically diagnosed in adulthood. Those genes encode for polycystic proteins and mutations regarding those genes are inherited and responsible for the disorder of autosomal dominant cystic kidney disease. In the United States, more than half a million people have PKD, making it the fourth leading cause of kidney failure. PKD affects all races and genders equally and those with PKD have a possibility of developing cysts in other organs such as liver, pancreas, spleen, ovaries, and large bowel. Usually, these latter cysts do not impose a problem. Half of patients have no manifestation of symptoms, but symptoms may include: hematuria, back or abdominal pain, or the development of hypertension. The disease is usually manifested before age 30, and 45% develop kidney failure by age 60. Mutation in the HDK1 gene is currently thought to be responsible for autosomal recessive polycystic kidney disease (ARPKD), which can be diagnosed in the womb, shortly after birth, and usually before 15 years of age.

== Cause ==
The site of preference for cyst development is the renal tubule. After growth of a few millimeters has occurred, the cysts detach from the parent tubule, this detachment induced by excessive proliferation of tubular epithelium or excessive fluid secretions.

== Diagnosis ==
Diagnosis includes imaging with ultrasound, CT and/or MRI. The least expensive, non-invasive, and most reliable method is ultrasonography but smaller cysts may escape detection, while the resolution of CT and MRI will enable smaller cysts to be captured. However, the increased complexity and expense of CT and MRI is usually reserved for higher risk situations. MRI can be used to monitor the development of cysts and growth of kidneys.Genetic test can be applicable to those who have a family history of PKD but is expensive and fails to detect PKD in 15% of cases where it is present.

=== Antenatal scans ===
Many forms of cystic kidney disease can be detected in children prior to birth. Abnormalities, which only affect one kidney, are unlikely to cause a problem with the healthy arrival of a baby. Abnormalities which affect both kidneys can have an effect on the baby's amniotic fluid volume, which can in turn lead to problems with lung development. Some forms of obstruction can be very hard to differentiate from cystic renal disease on early scans.

Multicystic dysplastic kidney - affects only one side; the other kidney is usually healthy.

Cystic dysplasia - can affect one or both kidneys

Autosomal recessive polycystic kidney disease

Autosomal dominant polycystic kidney disease

Posterior urethral valves - easily mistaken for cystic renal disease on early scans; appearances are due to obstruction not cysts

High grade vesico-ureteric reflux - easily mistaken for cystic renal disease on early scans

Pelvi-ureteric junction obstruction - easily mistaken for cystic renal disease on early scans

== Treatment ==
The goal of treatment is to manage the disease and its symptoms, and to avoid or delay complications. Options include pain medication (except ibuprofen and other ‘non-steroidal anti-inflammatory agents (NSAID’s)’ which may worsen kidney function), low protein and sodium diet, diuretics, antibiotics to treat urinary tract infection, or interventions to drain cysts. In advanced cystic kidney disease with renal failure, renal transplant or dialysis may ultimately be necessary.

== Prognosis ==
By late 70s, 50-75% of patients with CKD require renal replacement therapy, either dialysis or kidney transplant. The number and size of cysts and kidney volume are predictors for the progression of CKD and end-stage renal disease. PKD does not increase the risk for the development of renal cancer, but if such develops, it is more likely to be bilateral. The most probable cause of death is heart disease, ruptured cerebral aneurysm, or disseminated infection. Some factors that can affect life expectancy are mutated gene type, gender, the age of onset, high blood pressure, proteinuria, hematuria, UTI, hormones, pregnancies, and size of cysts. If risk factors are controlled and the disease is stabilized then the patient's life expectancy can be prolonged greatly.
