= Polycystin =

Polycystin refers to one of the following proteins:

- Polycystin-1 (PKD1)
- Polycystin-2 (PKD2)

== See also ==
- Polycystine
