= Autosomal recessive polycystic kidney disease =

- Other names: ARPKD
- ARPKD is inherited in an autosomal recessive pattern
- Specialty: Medical genetics
- Symptoms: Polyuria
- Causes: Mutations in the PKHD1 gene
- Diagnostic method: Ultrasound
- Treatment: Medications for hypertension

Autosomal recessive polycystic kidney disease (ARPKD) is the recessive form of polycystic kidney disease. It is associated with a group of congenital fibrocystic syndromes. Mutations in the PKHD1 (chromosomal locus 6p12.2) cause ARPKD.

== Signs and symptoms ==
Symptoms and signs include abdominal discomfort, polyuria, polydipsia, incidental discovery of hypertension, and abdominal mass. The classic presentation for ARPKD is systemic hypertension with progression to end-stage kidney disease (ESKD) by the age of 15. In a typical presentation, a small number of individuals with ARPKD live to adulthood with some kidney function; but with significant deterioration in liver function. This outcome is postulated to result from expression of the polycystic kidney and hepatic disease gene PKHD1, which is located on chromosome 6p. In severe cases, a fetus will present with oligohydramnios and as a result, may present with Potter sequence.

== Genetics ==
The cause of ARPKD is linked to mutations in the PKHD1 gene. The PKHD1 gene encodes for the protein for fibrocystin, that is found in the epithelial cells of both the renal tubule and the bile ducts; deficiency leads to the characteristic polycystic dilation of both structures.

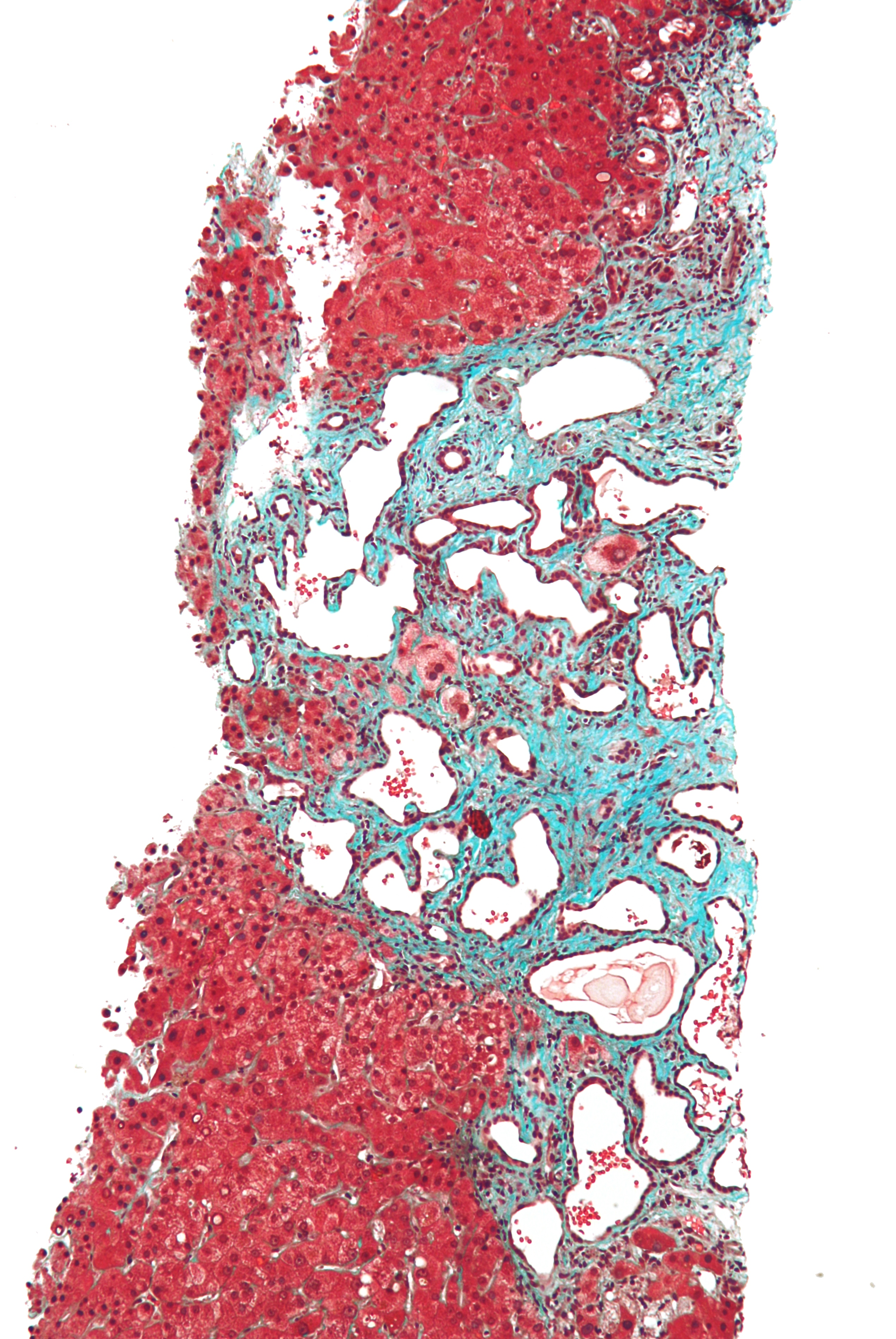
Micrograph of von Meyenburg complex.

ARPKD is a significant hereditary renal disease in that appears in childhood. The prevalence is estimated to be of 1 in 20,000 live births, with a reported carrier frequency of up to 1:70. PKHD1 is the only gene that is found to be responsible for the disease presentation of ARPKD.

While a genetic diagnosis is made in only approximately 75% of typical ARPKD cases using standard screening procedures, the rest are thought to be mainly attributed to other non-coding variants, such as non-coding deep-intronic point mutations or structural variants, both results in the transcription of an aberrant PKHD1 mRNA. Of note, several such instances has previousely been published, and while most of the cases are sporadic, one study describes a non-coding founder mutation, responsible for significant morbidity in Israely Bedouins.

PKHD1 is located on the human chromosome region 6p21.1–6p12.2. It is also one of the largest genes in the genome as it occupies approximately 450 kb of DNA, and contains at least 86 exons.

It is capable of producing multiple alternatively spliced transcripts. The largest known transcript encodes fibrocystin /polyductin (FPC), which is a large receptor-like integral membrane protein of 4074 amino acids. The structure of the FPC consist of a single transmembrane, a large N-terminal extracellular region, and a short intracellular cytoplasmic domain. The FPC protein is found on the primary cilia of epithelia cells of cortical and medullary collecting ducts and cholangiocytes of bile ducts, and show similarity to polycystins and several other ciliopathy proteins. FPC is also found to be expressed on the basal body and plasma membrane. It is presumed that the large extracellular domain of FPC binds to a ligand(s) that is yet unknown and that is also involved in cell-cell and cell-matrix interactions.

It is known that FPC interacts with ADPKD protein PC2 and may also participate in this regulation pathway of the mechanosensory function of the primary cilia, calcium signaling, and PCP. This is suggesting a common mechanism underlying cystogenesis between ADPKD and ARPKD. The FPC protein is also found on the centrosomes and mitotic spindle and may regulate centrosome duplication and mitotic spindle assembly during cell division. There have been a large number of various single-gene mutations found throughout PKHD1 and are unique to individual families. Most of the patients are compound heterozygotes for PKHD1 mutations. Patients with two nonsense mutations appear to have an earlier onset of the disease.

== Diagnosis ==
Autosomal recessive polycystic kidney disease with a normal kidney inset

Ultrasonography is the primary method to evaluate autosomal recessive polycystic kidney disease, particularly in the perinatal and neonatal stages.

=== Differential diagnosis ===
The differential diagnoses of this condition include:

- Glomerulocystic kidney disease
- Autosomal dominant polycystic kidney disease
- Diffuse cystic dysplasia

== Treatment ==
The treatment options for autosomal recessive polycystic kidney disease, given there is no current cure, are:

- Medications for hypertension
- Medications and/or surgery for pain
- Antibiotics for infection
- Dialysis (if kidney failure is present)
- Kidney transplantation (in serious cases)
