= PKD2L2 =

Protein-coding gene in humans

Identifiers
- Aliases: PKD2L2, TRPP5, polycystin 2 like 2, transient receptor potential cation channel
- External IDs: OMIM: 604669; MGI: 1858231; GeneCards: PKD2L2

Gene location (Human)
Chr.	Chromosome 5 (human)
Band	5q31.2	Start	137,887,968 bp
Band	5q31.2	End	137,942,747 bp

Gene location (Mouse)
Chr.	Chromosome 18 (mouse)
Band	18|18 B1	Start	34,541,542 bp
Band	18|18 B1	End	34,577,169 bp
RNA expression pattern
Bgee	Human / Mouse (ortholog); Top expressed in: tendon of biceps brachii; buccal mucosa cell; testicle; left testis; right testis; sperm; internal globus pallidus; gonad; muscle of thigh; Achilles tendon / Top expressed in: zygote; primary oocyte; secondary oocyte; spermatocyte; spermatid; granulocyte; seminiferous tubule; egg cell; supraoptic nucleus; muscle of thigh; More reference expression data
BioGPS	n/a
Gene ontology
Molecular function	calcium ion binding; calcium channel activity
Cellular component	integral component of membrane; membrane
Biological process	ion transport; detection of mechanical stimulus; calcium ion transmembrane transport; biological process
Sources:Amigo / QuickGO
Orthologs
Databases	NCBI: entry; OMA: entry
Species	Human	Mouse
Entrez	27039	53871
Ensembl	ENSG00000078795	ENSMUSG00000014503
UniProt	Q9NZM6	Q9JLG4
RefSeq (mRNA)	NM_001258448; NM_001258449; NM_001300921; NM_014386	NM_001163004; NM_016927
RefSeq (protein)	NP_001245377; NP_001245378; NP_001287850; NP_055201	NP_001156476; NP_058623
Location (UCSC)	Chr 5: 137.89 – 137.94 Mb	Chr 18: 34.54 – 34.58 Mb
PubMed search
- Wikidata
View/Edit Human	View/Edit Mouse

Polycystic kidney disease 2-like 2 protein (PKD2L2) also known as transient receptor potential polycystic 5 (TRPP5) is a protein that in humans is encoded by the PKD2L2 gene.

This protein is a member of the transient receptor potential channel family of proteins, and is a homolog of Polycystin 2 (PKD2).

== See also ==
- TRPP
