= PKD2L1 =

Protein-coding gene in the species Homo sapiens

Identifiers
- Aliases: PKD2L1, PCL, PKD2L, PKDL, TRPP3, polycystin 2 like 1, transient receptor potential cation channel
- External IDs: OMIM: 604532; MGI: 1352448; GeneCards: PKD2L1
Available structures
PDB	Ortholog search: PDBe RCSB
PDB	List of PDB id codes 3TE3, 4GIF

Gene location (Human)
Chr.	Chromosome 10 (human)
Band	10q24.31	Start	100,288,149 bp
Band	10q24.31	End	100,330,264 bp

Gene location (Mouse)
Chr.	Chromosome 19 (mouse)
Band	19 C3|19 36.91 cM	Start	44,136,076 bp
Band	19 C3|19 36.91 cM	End	44,180,881 bp
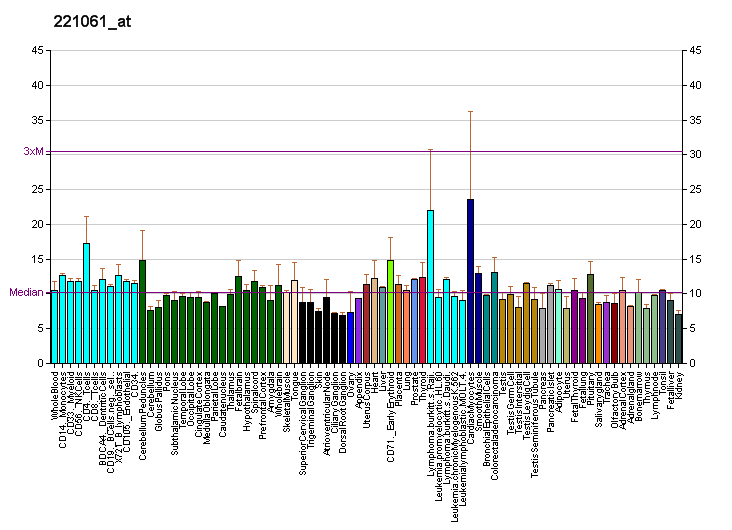
RNA expression pattern
Bgee	Human / Mouse (ortholog); Top expressed in: spleen; right frontal lobe; Brodmann area 9; sperm; glomerulus; right lung; anterior cingulate cortex; prefrontal cortex; placenta; mononuclear cell / Top expressed in: lumbar subsegment of spinal cord; spermatocyte; seminiferous tubule; embryo; embryo; anterior horn of spinal cord; tongue; vallate papilla; gastrula; spermatid; More reference expression data
BioGPS	More reference expression data
Gene ontology
Molecular function	calcium ion binding; calcium activated cation channel activity; muscle alpha-actinin binding; calcium channel activity; cation transmembrane transporter activity; calcium-activated potassium channel activity; sodium channel activity; cytoskeletal protein binding; protein binding; alpha-actinin binding; cation channel activity; identical protein binding; sour taste receptor activity
Cellular component	integral component of membrane; cell projection; calcium channel complex; membrane; intracellular membrane-bounded organelle; receptor complex; plasma membrane; cilium; cell surface; endoplasmic reticulum; ciliary membrane; cation channel complex; non-motile cilium; integral component of plasma membrane; cytoplasmic vesicle
Biological process	sodium ion transmembrane transport; cellular response to acidic pH; cation transport; sensory perception of sour taste; ion transport; protein homotrimerization; calcium ion transmembrane transport; detection of mechanical stimulus; potassium ion transmembrane transport; smoothened signaling pathway; detection of chemical stimulus involved in sensory perception of sour taste; calcium ion transport; response to water; detection of chemical stimulus involved in sensory perception of taste; protein tetramerization; protein homotetramerization; cellular response to pH; inorganic cation transmembrane transport
Sources:Amigo / QuickGO
Orthologs
Databases	NCBI: entry; OMA: entry
Species	Human	Mouse
Entrez	9033	329064
Ensembl	ENSG00000107593	ENSMUSG00000037578
UniProt	Q9P0L9	A2A259
RefSeq (mRNA)	NM_001253837; NM_016112	NM_181422
RefSeq (protein)	NP_001240766; NP_057196	NP_852087
Location (UCSC)	Chr 10: 100.29 – 100.33 Mb	Chr 19: 44.14 – 44.18 Mb
PubMed search
- Wikidata
View/Edit Human	View/Edit Mouse

Polycystic kidney disease 2-like 1 protein also known as transient receptor potential polycystic 3 (TRPP3) is a protein that in humans is encoded by the PKD2L1 gene.

== Function ==
PKD2L1 is a member of the polycystin protein family. PKD2L1 contains multiple transmembrane domains, and cytoplasmic N- and C-termini. PKD2L1 may be an integral membrane protein involved in cell-cell/matrix interactions. PKD2L1 functions as a calcium-regulated nonselective cation channel. Alternative splice variants have been described but their full length sequences have not been determined.

== Interactions ==
PKD2L1 has been shown to interact with TNNI3.

== See also ==
- TRPP
