= Sequence (medicine) =

In medicine, a sequence is a series of ordered consequences due to a single cause.

It differs from a syndrome in that seriality is more predictable: if A causes B, and B causes C, and C causes D, then D would not be seen if C is not seen. However, in less formal contexts, the term "syndrome" is sometimes used instead of sequence. Examples include:

- Oligohydramnios sequence (also known as Potter sequence)
- Pierre Robin sequence
- Poland sequence
