= Fibrocystin =

Mammalian protein

PKHD1

Identifiers
- Aliases: PKHD1, ARPKD, FCYT, TIGM1, polycystic kidney and hepatic disease 1 (autosomal recessive), fibrocystin/polyductin, FPC, PKD4, PKHD1 ciliary IPT domain containing fibrocystin/polyductin
- External IDs: OMIM: 606702; MGI: 2155808; GeneCards: PKHD1

Gene location (Human)
Chr.	Chromosome 6 (human)
Band	6p12.3-p12.2	Start	51,615,299 bp
Band	6p12.3-p12.2	End	52,087,613 bp

Gene location (Mouse)
Chr.	Chromosome 1 (mouse)
Band	1|1 A4	Start	20,128,003 bp
Band	1|1 A4	End	20,688,288 bp
RNA expression pattern
Bgee	Human / Mouse (ortholog); Top expressed in: renal medulla; pancreatic epithelial cell; body of pancreas; corpus epididymis; human kidney; testicle; tibialis anterior muscle; caput epididymis; islet of Langerhans; right lobe of liver / Top expressed in: transitional epithelium of urinary bladder; human kidney; renal calyx; efferent ductule; medullary collecting duct; inner renal medulla; right kidney; left lobe of liver; morula; pancreas; More reference expression data
BioGPS	n/a
Gene ontology
Molecular function	protein binding; signaling receptor activity
Cellular component	cytoplasm; integral component of membrane; ciliary basal body; centrosome; cell projection; membrane; plasma membrane; spindle; chromosome; apical plasma membrane; anchored component of external side of plasma membrane; perinuclear region of cytoplasm; mitotic spindle; chromosome, centromeric region; extracellular exosome; cytoskeleton; cilium
Biological process	negative regulation of protein kinase B signaling; regulation of centrosome duplication; regulation of TOR signaling; kidney development; cellular calcium ion homeostasis; negative regulation of apoptotic process; positive regulation of cell population proliferation; regulation of ERK1 and ERK2 cascade; negative regulation of NF-kappaB transcription factor activity; homeostatic process; cilium assembly; cell-cell adhesion
Sources:Amigo / QuickGO
Orthologs
Databases	NCBI: entry; OMA: entry
Species	Human	Mouse
Entrez	5314	241035
Ensembl	ENSG00000170927	ENSMUSG00000043760
UniProt	P08F94	E9PZ36
RefSeq (mRNA)	NM_138694; NM_170724	NM_153179
RefSeq (protein)	NP_619639; NP_733842	NP_694819
Location (UCSC)	Chr 6: 51.62 – 52.09 Mb	Chr 1: 20.13 – 20.69 Mb
PubMed search
- Wikidata
View/Edit Human	View/Edit Mouse

Fibrocystin

Identifiers
- Symbol: Fibrocystin
- InterPro: IPR029927
- Membranome: 632
Available protein structures:
- PDB: IPR029927
- AlphaFold: IPR029927

Fibrocystin is a large, receptor-like protein that in humans is encoded by the PKHD1 gene. It is thought to be involved in the tubulogenesis and/or maintenance of duct-lumen architecture of epithelium.

== Gene ==
The PKHD1 gene is located at chromosomal locus 6p12.2 and encodes fibrocystin. It contains numerous exons and introns and produces multiple transcripts through alternative splicing.

== Tissue distribution ==
Fibrocystin is found in the epithelial cells lining the renal tubules and bile ducts.

== Structure ==
The large size of fibrocystin has limited its experimental structural characterization and complicated computational prediction of its full domain architecture. Joshua Pillai, Matthew Sampson, and John Sayer from Boston Children's Hospital have introduced a computational model known as the serpentine model, which proposes a complete domain architecture for fibrocystin.

== Function ==
Fibrocystin, also known as polyductin (FPC), localizes to the primary cilia of renal epithelial cells, where it colocalizes with polycystin-2 (PC2), a cation channel encoded by PKD2. In mice lacking functional fibrocystin, renal polycystin-2 protein levels were reduced, and cultured renal epithelial cells from these mice showed lower polycystin-2 channel activity. These findings suggest that fibrocystin helps regulate polycystin-2 and that the two proteins may act in a common pathway involved in renal tubule formation.

== Clinical significance ==
Biallelic pathogenic variants in PKHD1 cause autosomal recessive polycystic kidney disease (ARPKD), which is characterized by cystic dilation of the renal tubules and bile ducts. Disease-causing variants include truncating variants and missense variants. Some deep-intronic variants can cause a pseudoexon to be included in the mature transcript, introducing a premature stop codon. A variant of this kind has been reported in Israeli Bedouin families with ARPKD.

In a cohort of 304 patients with ARPKD, missense variants affecting fibrocystin residues 709–1837 were associated with a lower risk of kidney failure, while variants affecting residues 1838–2624 were associated with more favorable liver outcomes. The serpentine model offers possible structural explanations for these associations. It places variants in the first region on the protein surface and suggests that variants in the second region may be less destabilizing.
