= Edith Potter =

American physician

- Born: September 26, 1901
- Died: March 22, 1993 (aged 91)
- Education: University of Minnesota (M.D., Ph.D.)
- Known for: Early work in perinatal pathology, especially in Rh disease and Potter sequence
- Scientific career
- Fields: Pathology
- Workplaces: University of Chicago; Chicago Lying-in Hospital

Edith Louise Potter (1901 – March 22, 1993) was an American physician and scientist who established the field of perinatal pathology. Potter made early contributions to the understanding of Rh disease. She established the link between a characteristic facial appearance and the absence of fetal kidneys, an association that became known as Potter sequence.

A native of Iowa, Potter received a medical degree and a Ph.D. at the University of Minnesota. She practiced pathology at the Chicago Lying-in Hospital for more than 30 years. After retiring from medical practice, Potter became known for her involvement in horticulture.

== Early life ==
Potter was born on September 26, 1901, in Clinton, Iowa, to William Harvey Potter and the former Edna Rugg Holmes. Her father was a locomotive engineer. She lived in Wisconsin and Minnesota as a child. She attended the University of Minnesota, where she earned an undergraduate degree and a medical degree. Potter interned in Minneapolis, pursued additional postgraduate study in Vienna, and then entered private medical practice in Minnesota for five years. She earned a Ph.D. from the University of Minnesota in 1934.

== Career ==
After completing her Ph.D., Potter moved to Chicago. She was a pathology instructor in the obstetrics and gynecology department at the University of Chicago. Potter stayed at the university until her retirement. The school was affiliated with the Chicago Lying-in Hospital, where Potter served as a pathologist. When a Chicago health department administrator began to consider the causes of infant mortality in the city, he decided to require autopsies in order for parents to obtain burial permits. In a period of more than 30 years, Potter performed more than 10,000 autopsies on infants.

In 1940, Potter co-wrote Fetal and Neonatal Death with her department chair, Fred Lyman Adair; the pair analyzed the causes of death of more than 500 infants who had died in the 1930s. They found that hypoxia and intracranial hemorrhage, which were associated with long labors and difficult deliveries, were two leading causes of death. As she gained more experience with autopsies, Potter felt that identifying abnormalities in individual infants was only a small part of her work. She said that a larger goal was to correlate the findings of specific infants with those of groups of other infants, integrating physical findings with other potential etiologic factors to identify patterns and causes of infant death.

Potter became well known for her work establishing Rh disease as an important cause of infant death. She also published a 1946 paper that tied renal agenesis to specific facial findings in a group of 20 babies. Several years later, it was established that bilateral renal agenesis resulted in oligohydramnios, and that the low levels of amniotic fluid caused fetal compression and the observed facial features. The process became known as Potter sequence.

Potter received an honorary doctorate from the University of Brazil; she had served for a year as a guest lecturer there. The University of South Florida later awarded her an honorary Doctor of Science.

== Personal life ==
In the summer of 1944, Potter married architectural sculptor Alvin Meyer, who had one daughter. Meyer was the sculpture department director for the architectural firm Holabird & Root, and his work was featured on the Chicago Board of Trade Building, which had been completed in 1930. Meyer served as the illustrator for one of Potter's books, Fundamentals of Human Reproduction (1948).

Potter retired in the mid-1960s and moved to Fort Myers, Florida, with Meyer. Meyer died in 1976.

Shortly thereafter, Potter married Frank Deats, an architectural coordinator and watercolorist who had retired to Fort Myers several years earlier. Deats, who was the godson of inventor J. Frank Duryea, helped in designing the National Gallery of Art and expanding the National Archives Building. Deats died in 1983.

== Later life ==
After her retirement from medicine, Potter became interested in horticulture, especially the cultivation of indoor plants. Potter grew bromeliads, and she donated 122 cultivars to the University of Minnesota in 1980 to establish the Meyer-Deats Conservatory at the school's arboretum. The conservatory was named in honor of Potter's husbands.

Potter was diagnosed with colon cancer late in life and she died while on a 1993 cruise in the Caribbean. An endowed professorship at Florida Gulf Coast University was established in Potter's name. She is also honored by the American Congress of Obstetricians and Gynecologists with a lectureship in her name.

== Publications ==
- Fetal and neonatal death (1939, with Fred L. Adair)
- Rh, its relation to congenital hemolytic disease & to intragroup transfusion reactions (1947)
- Fundamentals of Human Reproduction (1948)
- Pathology of the Fetus and Infant (1953)
