= Polycystic kidney disease =

Congenital disorder of urinary system

- Other names: Kidney - polycystic
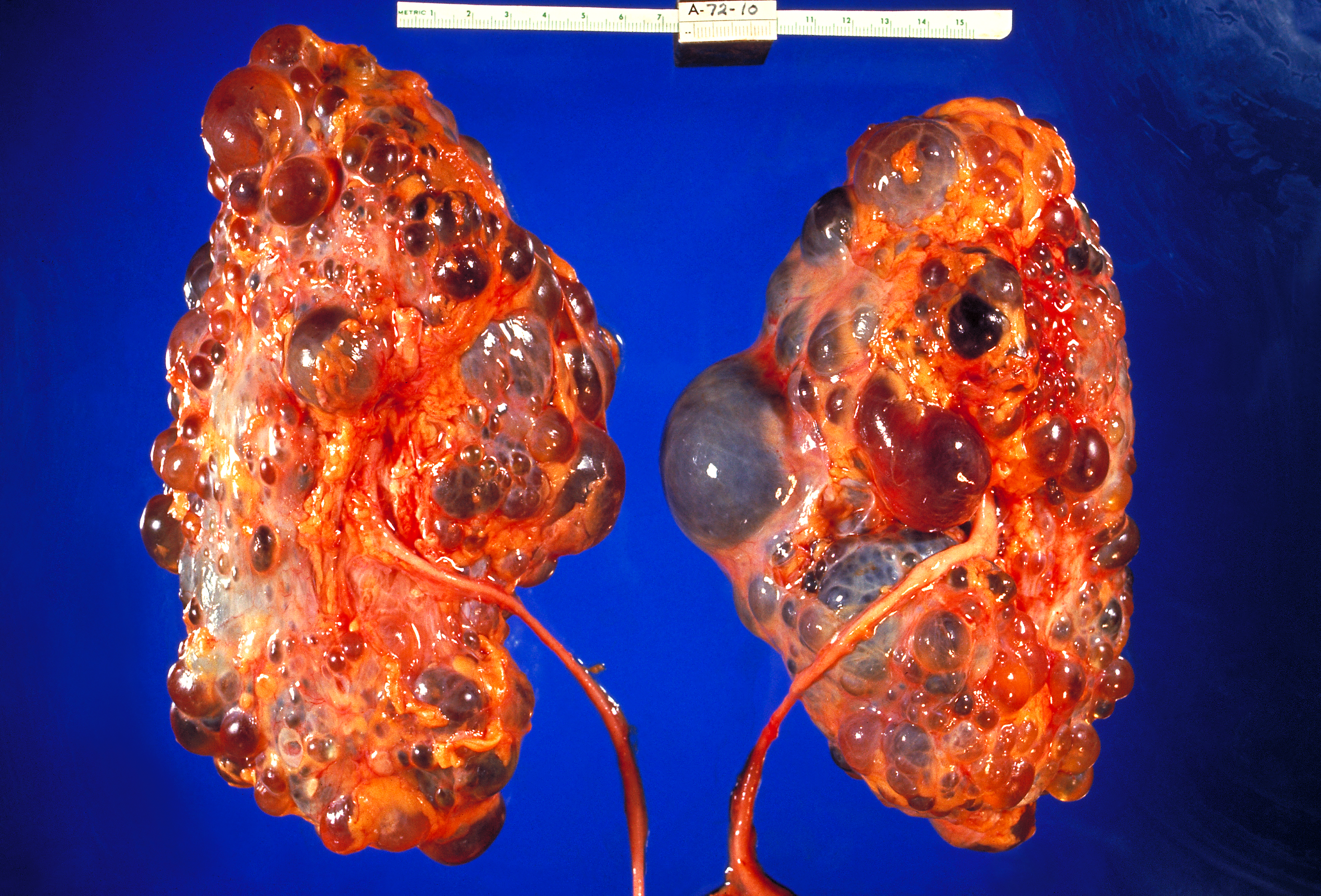
- Severely affected polycystic kidneys removed at the time of transplantation
- Specialty: Nephrology
- Symptoms: Abdominal pain
- Types: ADPKD and ARPKD
- Diagnostic method: MRI, CT scan, Ultrasound
- Treatment: Antihypertensives, Life style management
- Frequency: 0.03%

Polycystic kidney disease (PKD or PCKD, also known as polycystic kidney syndrome) is a genetic disorder in which the renal tubules become structurally abnormal, resulting in the development and growth of multiple cysts within the kidney. These cysts may begin to develop in utero, in infancy, childhood, or in adulthood. Cysts are non-functioning tubules filled with fluid pumped into them, which range in size from microscopic to enormous, crushing adjacent normal tubules and eventually rendering them non-functional as well.

PKD is caused by abnormal genes that produce a specific abnormal protein; this protein harms tubule development. PKD is a general term for two types, each having its own pathology and genetic cause: autosomal dominant polycystic kidney disease (ADPKD) and autosomal recessive polycystic kidney disease (ARPKD). The abnormal gene exists in all cells in the body; as a result, cysts may occur in the liver, seminal vesicles, and pancreas. This genetic defect can also cause aortic root aneurysms, and aneurysms in the circle of Willis cerebral arteries, which, if they rupture, can cause a subarachnoid hemorrhage.

Diagnosis may be suspected from one, some, or all of the following: new onset flank pain or red urine; a positive family history; palpation of enlarged kidneys on physical exam; an incidental finding on abdominal sonogram; or an incidental finding of abnormal kidney function on routine lab work (BUN, serum creatinine, or eGFR). Definitive diagnosis is made by abdominal CT exam.

Complications include hypertension due to the activation of the renin–angiotensin–aldosterone system (RAAS), frequent cyst infections, urinary bleeding, and declining renal function. Hypertension is treated with angiotensin converting enzyme inhibitors (ACEIs) or angiotensin receptor blockers (ARBs). Infections are treated with antibiotics. Declining renal function is treated with renal replacement therapy (RRT): dialysis and/or transplantation. Management from the time of the suspected or definitive diagnosis is by an appropriately trained doctor.

== Signs and symptoms ==
Signs and symptoms include high blood pressure, headaches, abdominal pain, blood in the urine, and excessive urination. Other symptoms include pain in the back, and cyst formation (renal and other organs).

== Cause ==
PKD is caused by abnormal genes that produce a specific abnormal protein, which hurts tubule development. PKD is a general term for two types, each having their own pathology and genetic cause: autosomal dominant polycystic kidney disease (ADPKD) and autosomal recessive polycystic kidney disease (ARPKD).

=== Autosomal dominant ===
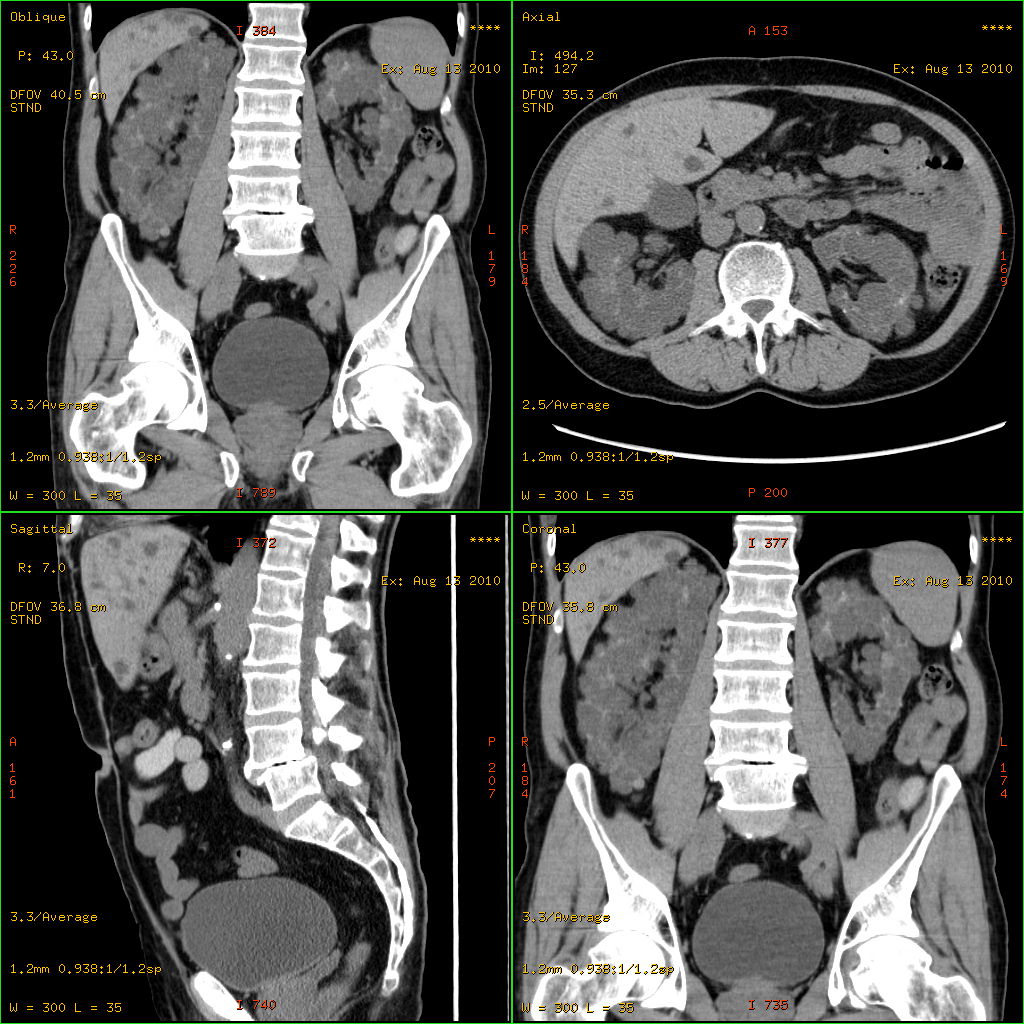
CT scan showing autosomal dominant polycystic kidney disease

Cartoon of autosomal dominant polycystic kidney disease with normal kidney inset to right of diagram

Cartoon of autosomal recessive polycystic kidney disease with normal kidney inset to right of diagram

Autosomal dominant polycystic kidney disease (ADPKD) is the most common of all the inherited cystic kidney diseases with an incidence of 1:500 live births. Studies show that 10% of end-stage kidney disease (ESKD) patients being treated with dialysis in Europe and the U.S. were initially diagnosed and treated for ADPKD.

Genetic mutations in any of the three genes PKD1, PKD2, and PKD3 have similar phenotypical presentations.

- Gene PKD1 is located on chromosome 16 and codes for a protein involved in cell cycle regulation and intracellular calcium transport in epithelial cells and is responsible for 85% of the cases of ADPKD.
- Gene PKD2 is identified, using genetic linkage study, on chromosome 4. A group of voltage-linked cation channels, with inward selectivity for K>Na>>Ca and outward selectivity for Ca2+ ≈ Ba2+ > Na+ ≈ K+, are coded for by PKD2 on chromosome 4.
- PKD3 recently appeared in research papers as a postulated third gene. Fewer than 10% of cases of ADPKD appear in non-ADPKD families. Cyst formation begins in utero from any point along the nephron, although fewer than 5% of nephrons are thought to be involved. As the cysts accumulate fluid, they enlarge, separate from the nephron, compress the neighboring kidney parenchyma, and progressively compromise kidney function.

=== Autosomal recessive ===
Autosomal recessive polycystic kidney disease (ARPKD) (OMIM #263200) is the less common of the two types of PKD, with an incidence of 1:20,000 live births, and is typically identified in the first few weeks after birth. Unfortunately, the kidneys are often underdeveloped, resulting in a 30% death rate in newborns with ARPKD. ARPKD is caused by mutations in the PKHD1 gene, which encodes fibrocystin, a large ciliary transmembrane protein expressed in renal tubular epithelial cells and the biliary duct epithelium. Fibrocystin is responsible for maintaining tubular and ductal structures, and its dysfunction disrupts normal tubular and ductal development, leading to cyst formation in the kidneys and congenital hepatic fibrosis.

== Mechanism ==
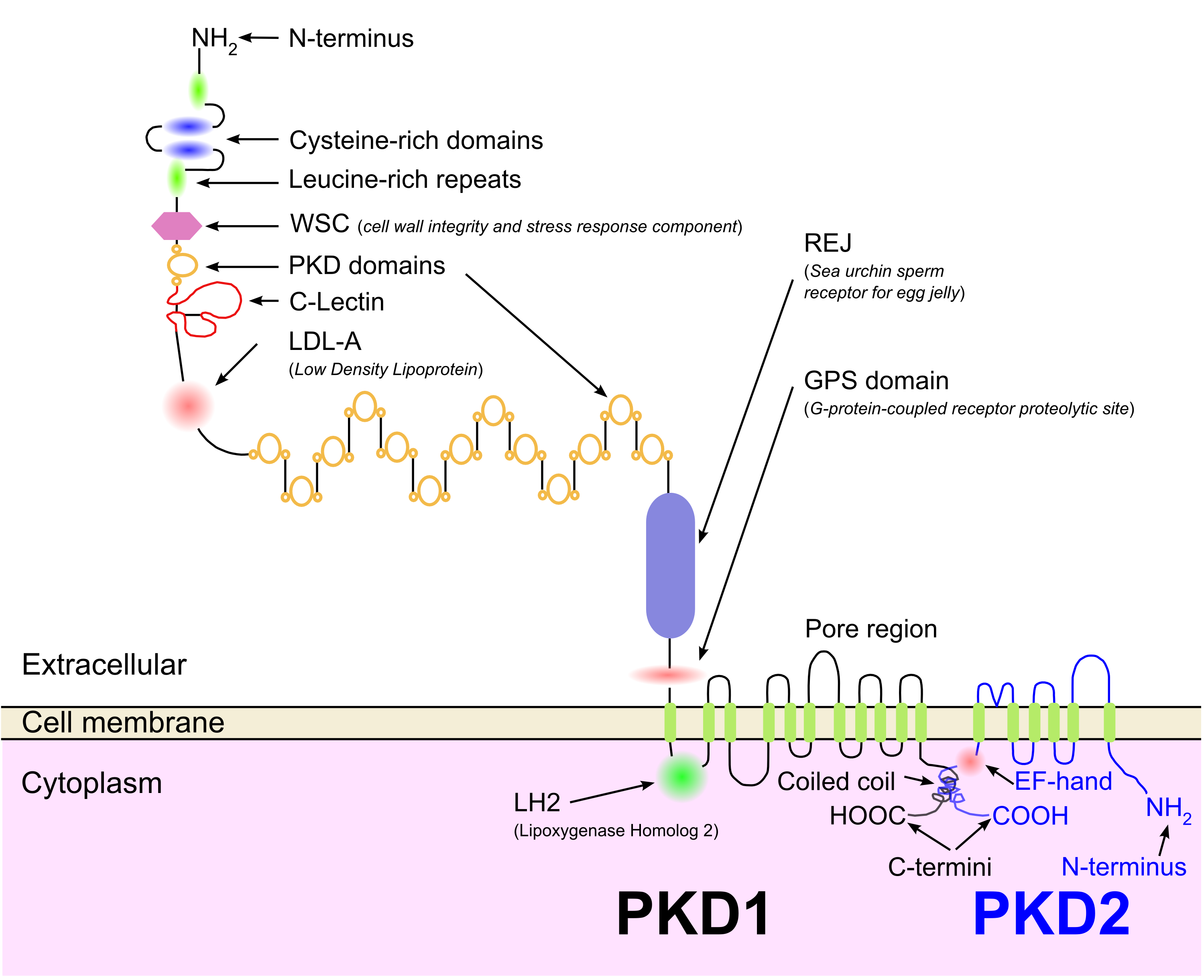
PKD1 and PKD2

Both autosomal dominant and autosomal recessive polycystic kidney disease cyst formation are tied to abnormal cilia-mediated signaling. The polycystin-1 and polycystin-2 proteins appear to be involved in both autosomal dominant and recessive polycystic kidney disease due to defects in both proteins. Both proteins communicate with calcium channel proteins, and cause a reduction in resting (intracellular) calcium and endoplasmic reticulum storage of calcium.

The disease is characterized by a 'second hit' phenomenon, in which a mutated dominant allele is inherited from a parent, with cyst formation occurring only after the normal, wild-type gene sustains a subsequent second genetic 'hit', resulting in renal tubular cyst formation and disease progression.

PKD results from defects in the primary cilium, an immotile, hair-like cellular organelle present on the surface of most cells in the body, anchored in the cell body by the basal body. In the kidney, primary cilia are present on most cells of the nephron, projecting from the apical surface of the renal epithelium into the tubule lumen. The cilia were believed to bend in the urine flow, leading to changes in signalling, however this has since been shown to be an experimental error (the bending of cilia was an artifact of focal plane compensation, and also the actual effect on micturition by severe hypertension and cardiac arrest) and that bending of cilia does not contribute to alterations in Ca flux. While it is not known how defects in the primary cilium lead to cyst development, it is thought to possibly be related to the disruption of one of the many signaling pathways regulated by the primary cilium, including intracellular calcium, Wnt/β-catenin, cyclic adenosine monophosphate (cAMP), or planar cell polarity (PCP). Function of the primary cilium is impaired, resulting in disruption of several intracellular signaling cascades which produce differentiation of cystic epithelium, increased cell division, increased apoptosis, and loss of resorptive capacity.

== Diagnosis ==
Polycystic kidney disease can be ascertained via a CT scan of abdomen, as well as an MRI and ultrasound of the same area. A physical exam/test can reveal enlarged liver, heart murmurs and elevated blood pressure.

=== Natural history ===
Most cases progress to bilateral disease in adulthood.

== Treatment ==
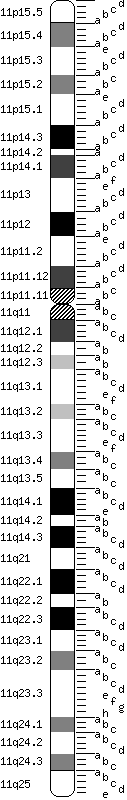
Chr 11 FISH-mapped BACs from CGAP

In 2018, Jynarque (tolvaptan) was introduced as the first FDA-approved treatment for PKD. In a recent long-term study, patients using tolvaptan had a 6.4% higher kidney function after 5 years compared to standard of care. In 2019, a team of researchers at UCSB found that a ketogenic diet might be able to halt, or even reverse progression in mice, and the results of a first human case series study are showing potential benefit. The results of a 3-month randomized, prospective dietary intervention clinical trial are pending. In addition, recent research indicates that mild to moderate calorie restriction or time-restricted feeding slow the progression of autosomal dominant polycystic kidney disease (ADPKD) in mice. Patient communities have been combining both ketogenic diets and time-restricted feeding with a low-oxalate diet to prevent the formation of stones and early reports show an average of 17% increase in kidney function after approximately one year on a ketogenic, time-restricted dietary regimen. If and when the disease progresses enough in a given case, the nephrologist or other practitioner and the patient will have to decide what form of renal replacement therapy will be used to treat end-stage kidney disease (kidney failure, typically stage 4 or 5 of chronic kidney disease).

That will either be some form of dialysis, which can be done at least two different ways at varying frequencies and durations (whether it is done at home or in the clinic depends on the method used and the patient's stability and training) and eventually, if they are eligible because of the nature and severity of their condition and if a suitable match can be found, unilateral or bilateral kidney transplantation.

A Cochrane Review study of autosomal dominant polycystic kidney disease made note of the fact that it is important at all times, while avoiding antibiotic resistance, to control infections of the cysts in the kidneys, and if affected, the liver, when needed for a certain duration to combat infection, by using, "bacteriostatic and bactericidal drugs".

== Prognosis ==
ADPKD individuals might have a normal life; conversely, ARPKD can cause kidney dysfunction and can lead to kidney failure by the age of 40–60. ADPKD1 and ADPKD2 are very different, in that ADPKD2 is much milder.

Currently, there are no therapies proven effective to prevent the progression of ADPKD.

== Epidemiology ==
PKD is one of the most common hereditary diseases in the United States, affecting more than 600,000 people. It is the cause of nearly 10% of all end-stage renal disease. It equally affects men, women, and all races. It causes about 5% of all kidney failure PKD occurs in some animals as well as humans.

== See also ==
- Autosomal dominant polycystic kidney disease
- Autosomal recessive polycystic kidney disease
