= Jugular vein ectasia =

- Pronunciation: vascular specialist/surgeorn

Jugular vein ectasia is a venous anomaly that commonly presents itself as a unilateral neck swelling in children and adults. It is rare to have bilateral neck swelling due to internal jugular vein ectasia.
