= Abdominal mass =

Localized enlargement or swelling in the human abdomen

An abdominal mass is any localized enlargement or swelling in the human abdomen. Depending on its location, the abdominal mass may be caused by an enlarged liver (hepatomegaly), enlarged spleen (splenomegaly), protruding kidney, a pancreatic mass, a retroperitoneal mass (a mass in the posterior of the peritoneum), an abdominal aortic aneurysm, or various tumours, such as those caused by abdominal carcinomatosis and omental metastasis. The treatments depend on the cause, and may range from watchful waiting to radical surgery.
