= Autosomal dominant polycystic kidney disease =

- Other names: Autosomal dominant PKD, adult-onset PKD
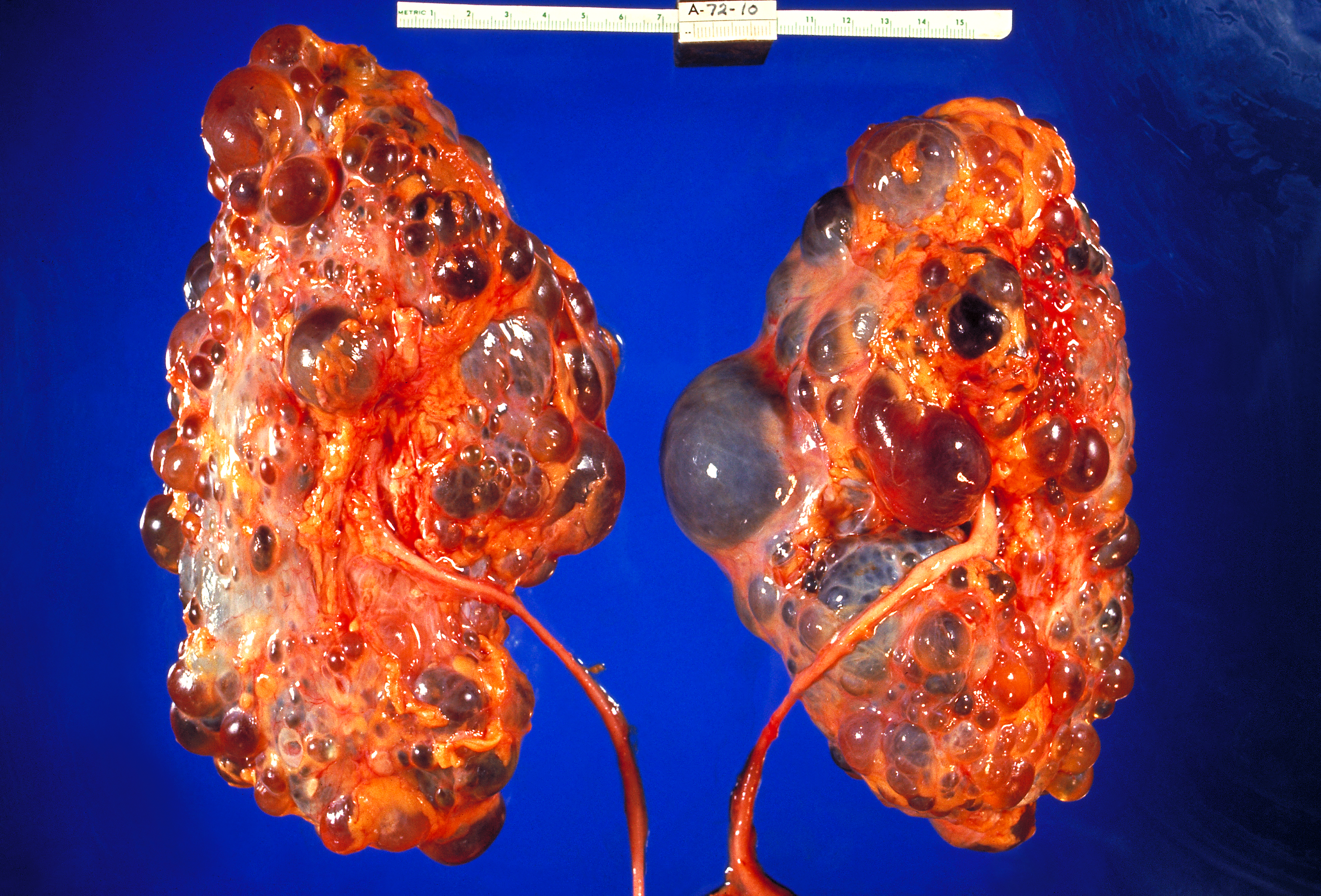
- Polycystic kidneys
- Specialty: Medical genetics

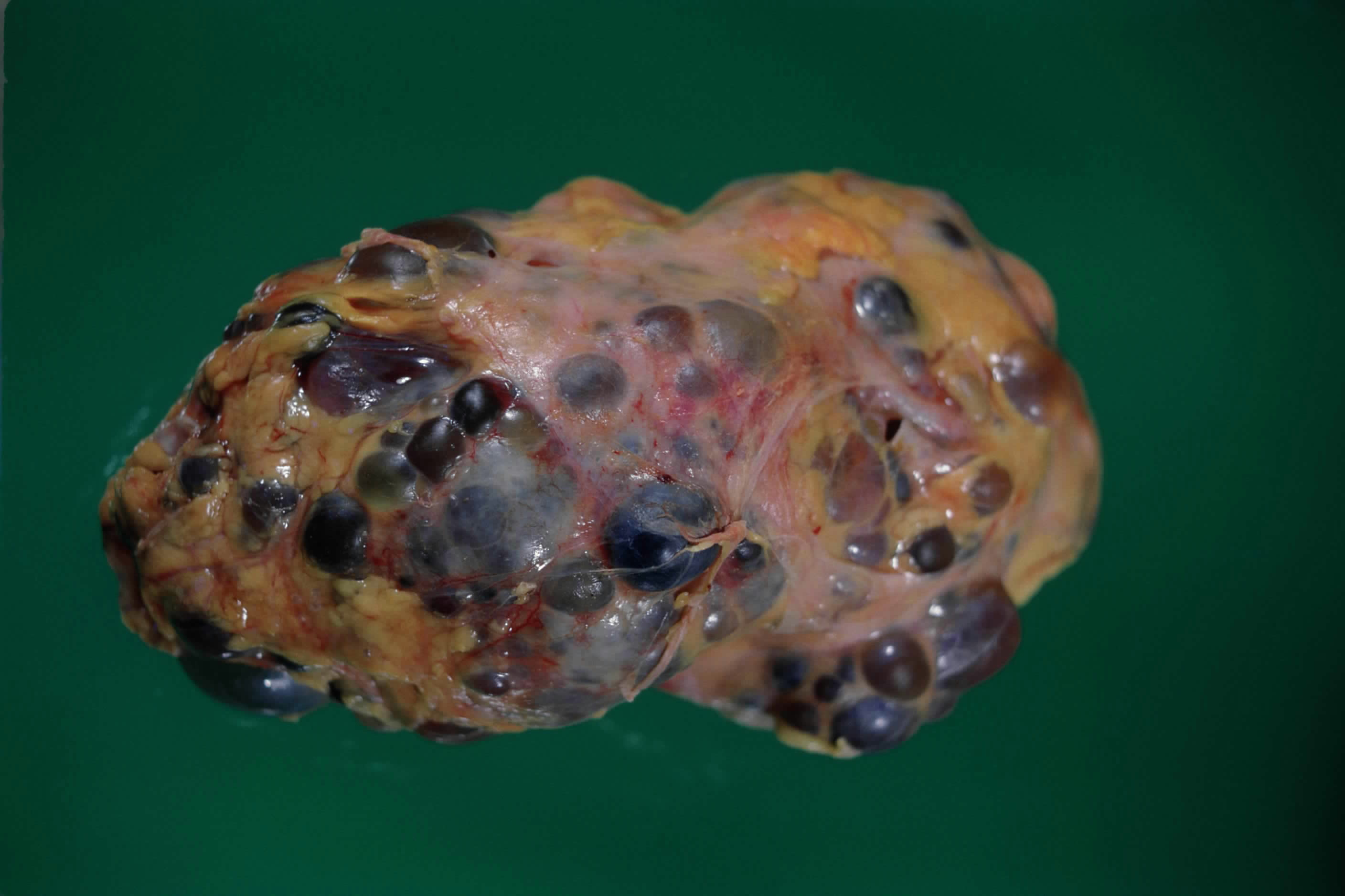
polycystic kidney, external surface with multiple cysts.

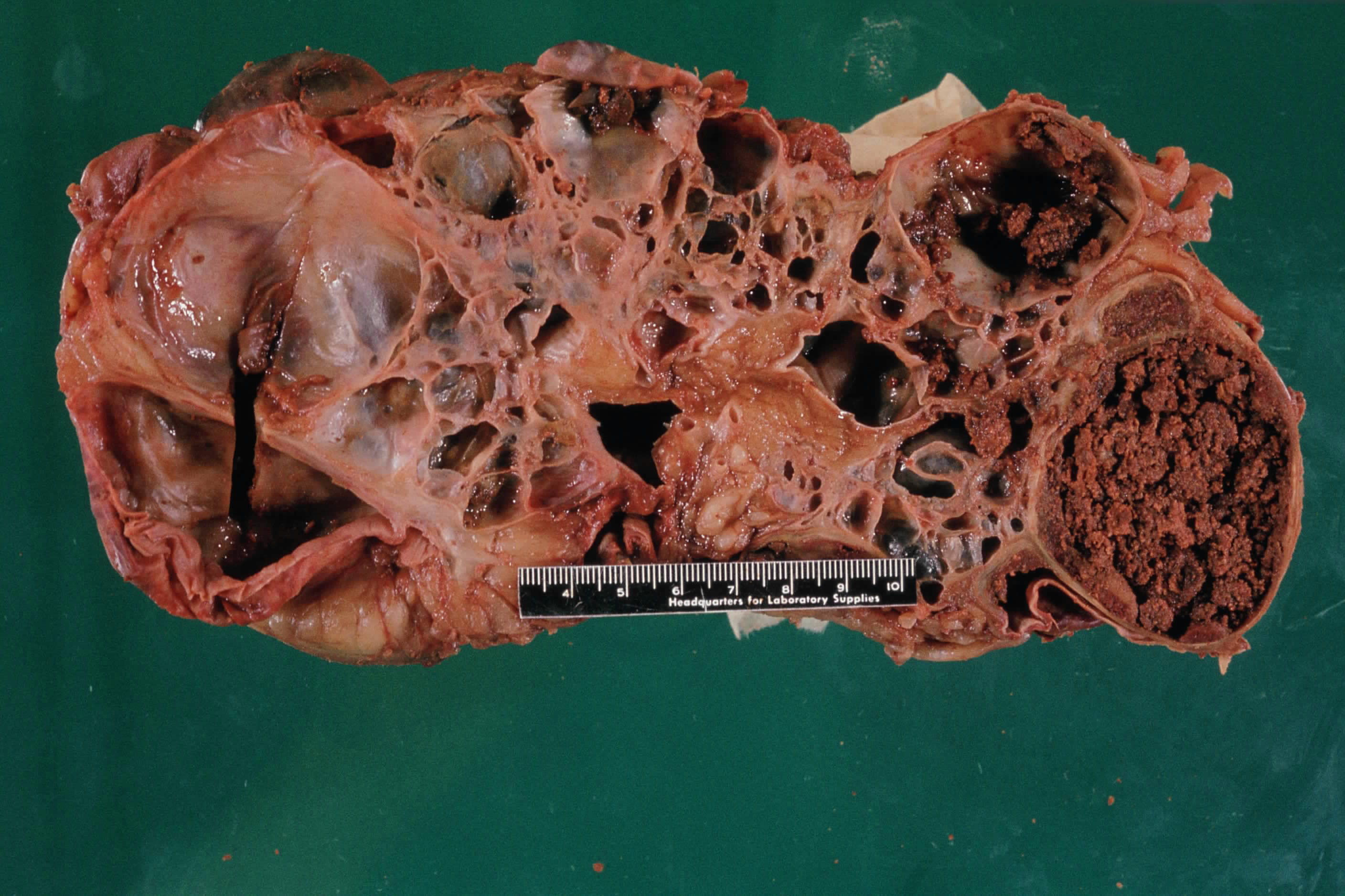
Cut surface of kidney showing multiple cysts with old and more recent haemorrhage.

Autosomal dominant polycystic kidney disease (ADPKD) is one of the most common, life-threatening inherited human disorders and the most common hereditary kidney disease. It is associated with large interfamilial and intrafamilial variability, which can be explained to a large extent by its genetic heterogeneity and modifier genes. It is also the most common of the inherited cystic kidney diseases — a group of disorders with related but distinct pathogenesis, characterized by the development of renal cysts and various extrarenal manifestations, which in case of ADPKD include cysts in other organs, such as the liver, seminal vesicles, pancreas, and arachnoid membrane, as well as other abnormalities, such as intracranial aneurysms and dolichoectasias, aortic root dilatation and aneurysms, mitral valve prolapse, and abdominal wall hernias. Over 50% of patients with ADPKD eventually develop end stage kidney disease and require dialysis or kidney transplantation. ADPKD is estimated to affect at least one in every 1000 individuals worldwide, making this disease the most common inherited kidney disorder with a diagnosed prevalence of 1:2000 and incidence of 1:3000-1:8000 in a global scale.

== Signs and symptoms ==
ADPKD can result in a wide variety of clinical symptoms. Symptoms may be caused directly by a cyst growing or bursting, or indirectly due to problems with other physiological functions. Most symptoms occur around 40 years of age, but some clinical symptoms can occur decades prior to the development of overt kidney disease, with some symptoms presenting as early as childhood.

Primary Symptoms Include:

- Early-onset hypertension
- Blood in urine
- Abdominal, flank, or back pain
- Masses in the abdomen or flank
- Decrease in renal function

Among the most common symptoms associated with it is early-onset hypertension. Early-onset hypertension is present in 50%-70% of individuals with ADPKD. Hypertension can even develop before the decline in kidney function markers like GFR (glomerular filtration rate).

The presence of ADPKD is associated with several extra-renal symptoms, including the development of cysts in organs outside of the kidney. Polycystic liver disease is often found in adults with ADPKD and can be present in greater than 90% of individuals with ADPKD over 35 years old. Polycystic liver disease develops more often in females with ADPKD than males, with risk factors including and exposure to non-endogenous sources of estrogen and multiple gestations. Individuals with polycystic liver disease due to ADPKD can also experience gastrointestinal symptoms related to the presence of cysts in the liver, such as early discomfort, fullness, and gastroesophageal reflux. In rare cases, portal hypertension with secondary ascites and pleural effusion can also occur.

Individuals with ADPKD are also at increased risk for developing intracranial aneurysms. The risk of intracranial aneurysms is estimated to be four times higher in people with ADPKD when compared to the general population, and as a result, screening with magnetic resonance angiography is recommended for high-risk populations.

Additionally, symptoms such as abdominal fullness, excessive urination, and recurring urinary tract infections (occurring more frequently in women than in men), kidney stones, and bladder infection are also associated with ADPKD.

ADPKD can also result in a wide array of symptoms beyond the kidneys, resulting in the following symptoms:

- Neurological: Arachnoid cysts, intracranial hemorrhage.
- Cardiovascular: Pericardial effusion, mitral valve prolapse, bicuspid aortic valve
- Endocrine: Pancreatic cysts
- Gastrointestinal: Polycystic liver disease, diverticulosis
- Pulmonary: Bronchiectasis
- Reproductive: Male infertility, seminal vesicle cysts, ovarian cysts

Among the clinical presentation are:

- Acute loin pain
- Blood in the urine
- Ballotable kidneys
- Subarachnoid hemorrhage (berry aneurysm)
- Hypertension
- Associated liver cysts
- Uremia due to kidney failure
- Anemia due to chronic kidney disease
- Increase RBC or erythropoietin secretion

Signs and symptoms of ADPKD often develop between 30 and 40 years of age.

== Genetics ==
ADPKD is genetically heterogeneous with two genes identified: PKD1 (chromosome region 16p13.3; around 85% cases) and PKD2 (4q21; around 15% cases). Several genetic mechanisms probably contribute to the phenotypic expression of the disease. Although evidence exists for a two-hit mechanism (germline and somatic inactivation of two PKD alleles) explaining the focal development of renal and hepatic cysts, haploinsufficiency is more likely to account for the vascular manifestations of the disease. Additionally, new mouse models homozygous for PKD1 hypomorphic alleles 22 and 23 and the demonstration of increased renal epithelial cell proliferation in PKD2 +/− mice suggest that mechanisms other than the two-hit hypothesis also contribute to the cystic phenotype.

Large interfamilial and intrafamilial variability occurs in ADPKD. Most individuals with PKD1 mutations have kidney failure by age 70 years, whereas more than 50% of individuals with PKD2 mutations have adequate renal function at that age (mean age of onset of end-stage renal disease: 54·3 years with PKD1; 74·0 years with PKD2).

The significant intrafamilial variability observed in the severity of renal and extrarenal manifestations points to genetic and environmental modifying factors that may influence the outcome of ADPKD, and results of an analysis of the variability in renal function between monozygotic twins and siblings support the role of genetic modifiers in this disease. It is estimated that 43–78% of the variance in age to ESRD could be due to heritable modifying factors, with parents as likely as children to show more severe disease in studies of parent-child pairs.

== Pathophysiology ==
In many patients with ADPKD, kidney dysfunction is not clinically apparent until 30 or 40 years of age. However, an increasing body of evidence suggests the formation of renal cysts starts in utero. Cysts initially form as small dilations in renal tubules, which then expand to form fluid-filled cavities of different sizes. Factors suggested to lead to cystogenesis include a germline mutation in one of the polycystin gene alleles, a somatic second hit that leads to the loss of the normal allele, and a third hit, which can be a renal insult that triggers cell proliferation, and an injury response. Due to numerous similarities between the pathophysiology of ADPKD and the pathophysiology of the renal response to injury, ADPKD has been described as a state of aberrant and persistent activation of renal injury response pathways. In the progression of the disease, continued dilation of the tubules through increased cell proliferation, fluid secretion, and separation from the parental tubule lead to the formation of cysts.

ADPKD, together with many other diseases that present with renal cysts, can be classified into a family of diseases known as ciliopathies. Epithelial cells of the renal tubules, including all the segments of the nephron and the collecting ducts (with the exception of intercalated cells) show the presence of a single primary apical cilium. Polycystin-1, the protein encoded by the PKD1 gene, is present on these cilia and is thought to sense the flow with its large extracellular domains, activating the calcium channels associated with polycystin-2, the product of gene PKD2, as a result of the genetic setting of ADPKD as explained in the genetics sub-section above.

Epithelial cell proliferation and fluid secretion lead to cystogenesis, which are two hallmark features of ADPKD. During the early stages of cystogenesis, cysts are attached to their parental renal tubules and a derivative of the glomerular filtrate enters the cysts. Once these cysts expand to approximately 2 mm in diameter, the cyst closes off from its parental tubule and after that fluid can only enter the cysts through transepithelial secretion, which in turn is suggested to increase due to secondary effects from an increased intracellular concentration of cyclic AMP (cAMP).

Clinically, the insidious increase in the number and size of renal cysts translates as a progressive increment in kidney volume. Studies led by Mayo Clinic professionals established that the total kidney volume (TKV) in a large cohort of ADPKD patients was 1060 ± 642ml with a mean increase of 204ml over three years, or 5.27% per year in the natural course of the disease, among other important, novel findings that were extensively studied for the first time.

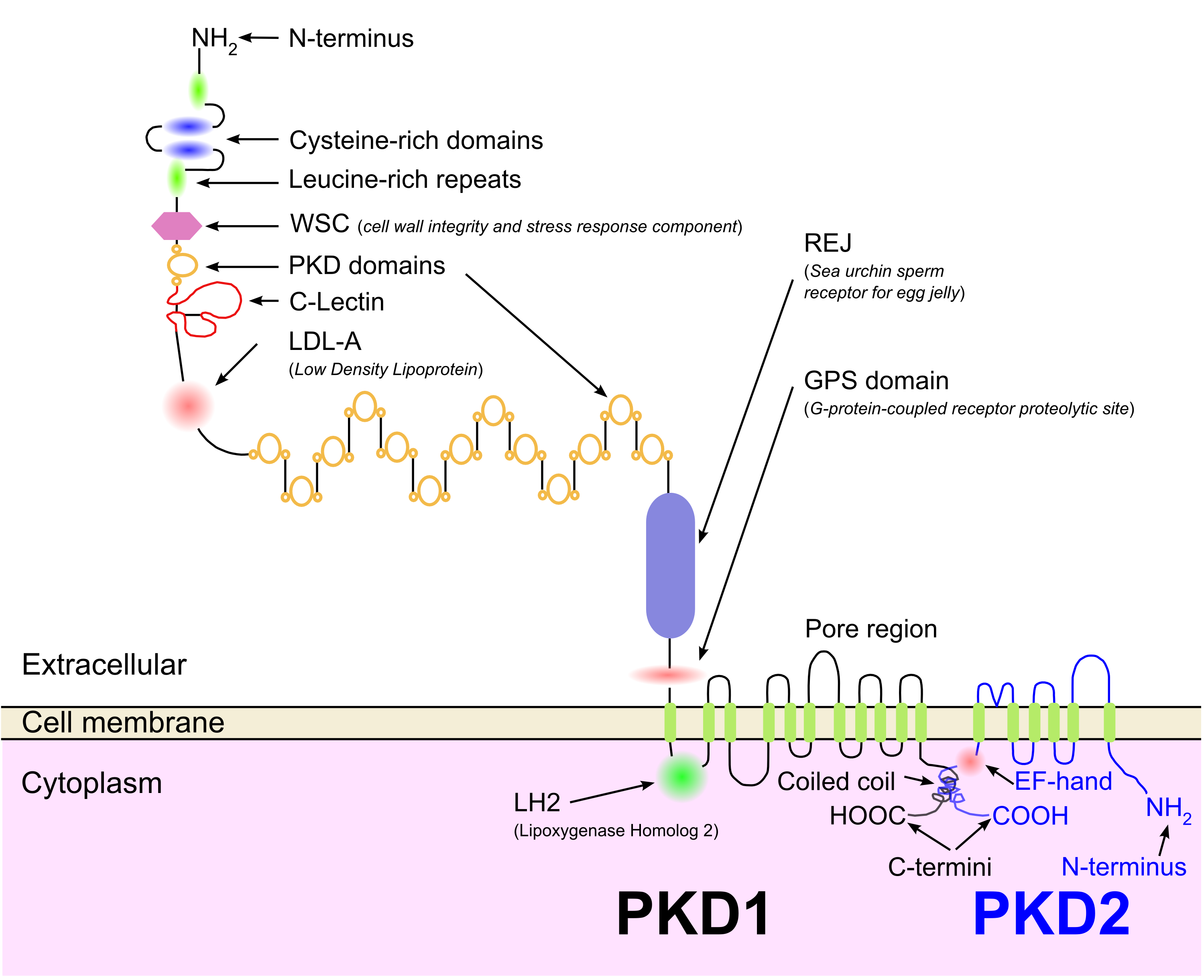
Illustration of PKD1 and PKD2 proteins at the cell membrane

== Diagnosis ==
Usually, the diagnosis of ADPKD is initially performed by renal imaging using ultrasound, CT scan, or MRI. However, molecular diagnostics can be necessary in the following situations: 1- when a definite diagnosis is required in young individuals, such as a potential living related donor in an affected family with equivocal imaging data; 2- in patients with a negative family history of ADPKD, because of potential phenotypic overlap with several other kidney cystic diseases; 3- in families affected by early-onset polycystic kidney disease, since in this cases hypomorphic alleles and/or oligogenic inheritance can be involved; and 4- in patients requesting genetic counseling, especially in couples wishing a pre-implantation genetic diagnosis.

The findings of large echogenic kidneys without distinct macroscopic cysts in an infant/child at 50% risk for ADPKD are diagnostic. In the absence of a family history of ADPKD, the presence of bilateral renal enlargement and cysts, with or without the presence of hepatic cysts, and the absence of other manifestations suggestive of a different renal cystic disease provides presumptively, but not definitively, evidence for the diagnosis. In some cases, intracranial aneurysms can be an associated sign of ADPKD, and screening can be recommended for patients with a family history of intracranial aneurysms.

Molecular genetic testing by linkage analysis or direct mutation screening is clinically available; however, genetic heterogeneity is a significant complication to molecular genetic testing. Sometimes, a relatively large number of affected family members need to be tested in order to establish which one of the two possible genes is responsible within each family. The large size and complexity of PKD1 and PKD2 genes, as well as marked allelic heterogeneity, present obstacles to molecular testing by direct DNA analysis. The sensitivity of testing is nearly 100% for all patients with ADPKD who are age 30 years or older and for younger patients with PKD1 mutations; these criteria are only 67% sensitive for patients with PKD2 mutations who are younger than age 30.

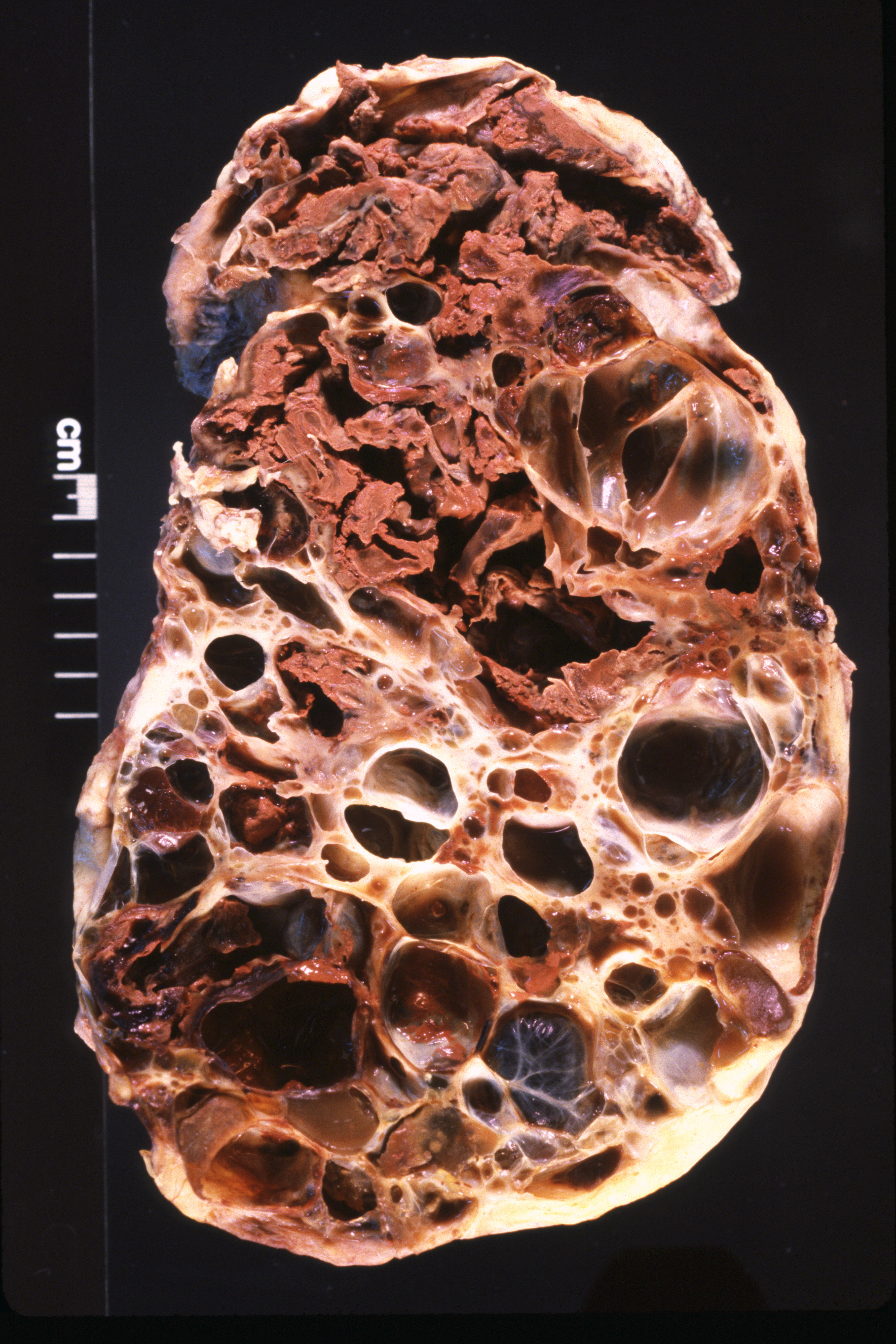
Adult polycystic kidney

Diagram of autosomal dominant polycystic disease with a normal kidney inset for comparison

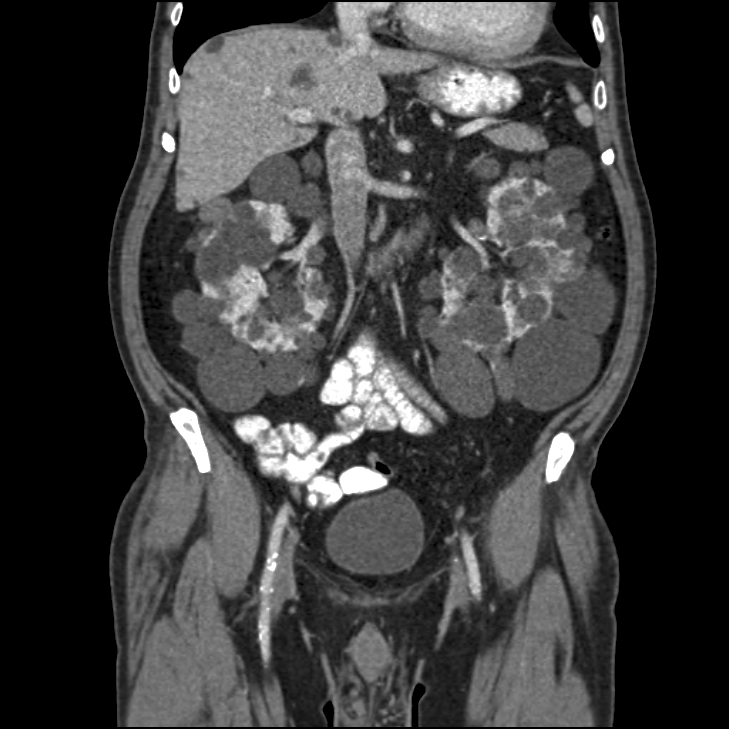
Abdominal CT scan of an adult with autosomal dominant polycystic kidney disease: Extensive cyst formation is seen over both kidneys, with a few cysts in the liver, as well. (Coronal plane)

== Treatment ==
Currently, the only pharmacological treatment available for ADPKD consists of reducing the rate of gain of total kidney volume (TKV) with vasopressin receptor 2 (V2) antagonists (i.e., tolvaptan). Tolvaptan treatment does not halt or reverse disease progression, and patients still progress towards renal failure. Palliative treatment modalities involve symptomatic medications (nonopioid and opioid analgesics) for abdominal/retroperitoneal pain. Options for analgesic-resistant pain include simple or complex surgical procedures (i.e., renal cyst aspiration, cyst decortication, renal denervation, and nephrectomy), which can result in complications inherent to surgery. Recent research suggests that ketogenic dietary interventions beneficially affect the progression and symptoms in individuals with ADPKD. Mild weight loss favorably affects pain indicating the benefit of dietary and lifestyle changes.

=== Aquaretic medication ===
In 2014, Japan was the first country in the world to approve a pharmacological treatment for ADPKD followed by Canada and Europe, which approved the drug tolvaptan for ADPKD patients at the beginning of 2015. The USA FDA approved the use of tolvaptan in the treatment of ADPKD in 2018. Tolvaptan, an aquaretic drug, is a vasopressin receptor 2 (V2) antagonist. Pre-clinical studies had suggested that the molecule cAMP could be involved in the enlargement of ADPKD cysts, and studies on rodents confirmed the role of vasopressin in increasing the levels of cAMP in the kidney, which laid the basis for the conduction of clinical studies. Because data from the Consortium for Radiologic Imaging Studies of Polycystic Kidney Disease (CRISP) led by Mayo Clinic showed that total kidney volume (TKV) predicted the risk of developing chronic kidney disease in patients with ADPKD, the TEMPO 3:4 trial, which enrolled patients from 129 sites worldwide from 2007 to 2009, evaluated TKV as a primary end-point to test the efficacy of tolvaptan in ADPKD patients. That study showed a significant decrease in the ratio of TKV increase and deterring of renal function decline in ADPKD patients after treatment with tolvaptan; however, because laboratory test results regarding liver function appeared elevated in a percentage of patients enrolled in that study, the approval of the drug was either delayed by regulatory agencies or, as in case of the US, altogether denied.

=== Dietary and lifestyle interventions ===
Research using ADPKD mouse models showed that mild food restriction strongly improved disease progression. The mechanism was shown to involve the metabolic state of ketosis, and beneficial effects could be produced by time-restricted feeding, acute fasting, a ketogenic diet, or by supplementation with the ketone beta-hydroxybutyrate in mouse, rat and cat models of ADPKD. A ketogenic diet regimen not only halted further disease progression but led to partial reversal of renal cystic disease in a rat model. The metabolic state of ketosis may be beneficial in ADPKD because renal cyst cells in ADPKD have a metabolic defect similar to the Warburg effect in cancer that makes them highly dependent on glucose, and unable to metabolize fatty acids and ketones. Consistent with this, serum glucose levels positively correlate with faster disease progression in ADPKD patients. Also, individuals with ADPKD and type 2 diabetes have significantly larger total kidney volume (TKV) than those with ADPKD alone, and overweight or obesity associate with faster progression in early-stage ADPKD. A retrospective case series study showed that ADPKD disease symptoms - including pain, hypertension and renal function - improved among 131 patients who implemented ketogenic diets for an average duration of 6 months.

Dietary intake of sodium is associated with worse renal function decline in ADPKD, and limiting sodium intake is generally recommended to patients. Dietary protein intake was not found to correlate with ADPKD progression.

Increased water intake is thought to be beneficial in ADPKD and is generally recommended. The underlying beneficial mechanism of increased water intake may be related to effects on the vasopressin V2 receptor or may be due to the suppression of harmful micro-crystal formation in renal tubules by dilution of solutes such as calcium oxalate, calcium phosphate, and uric acid.

Dietary intake of oxalate or inorganic phosphate has been shown to accelerate PKD disease progression in several rodent models. Low levels, or urinary citrate – a natural antagonist of the formation of harmful crystals in kidney tubules – have been shown to associate with worse disease progression in ADPKD patients.

=== Analgesic medication ===
Chronic pain in patients with ADPKD is often refractory to conservative, noninvasive treatments, but nonopioid analgesics and conservative interventions can be first used before opioid analgesics are considered; if pain continues, then surgical interventions can target renal or hepatic cysts to directly address the cause of pain, with surgical options including renal cyst decortication, renal denervation, and nephrectomy.

=== Renal cyst aspiration ===
Aspiration with ethanol sclerotherapy can be performed for the treatment of symptomatic simple renal cysts, but can be impractical in advanced patients with multiple cysts. The procedure itself consists in the percutaneous insertion of a needle into the identified cyst, under ultrasound guidance, with subsequent draining the contained liquid; the sclerotherapy is used to avoid liquid reaccumulation that can occur in the cyst, which can result in symptom recurrence.

=== Laparoscopic cyst decortication ===
Laparoscopic cyst decortication (also referred to as marsupialization) consists of the removal of one or more kidney cysts through laparoscopic surgery, during which cysts are punctured, and the outer wall of the larger cysts is excised with care not to incise the renal parenchyma. This procedure can be useful for pain relief in patients with ADPKD, and is usually indicated after earlier cyst aspiration has confirmed that the cyst to be decorticated is responsible for pain. Nonrandomised controlled trials conducted in the '90s showed that patients with symptomatic simple renal cysts who had recurrence of symptoms after initial response to simple aspiration could be safely submitted to cyst decortication, with a mean pain-free life between 17 and 24 months after surgery. Laparoscopic decortication presents a 5% recurrence rate of renal cysts compared to an 82% recurrence rate obtained with sclerotherapy.

=== Neurolysis ===
A novel treatment of specifically the chronic pain experienced by many with ADPKD is Celiac plexus neurolysis. This involves the chemical ablation of the celiac plexus, to cause a temporary degeneration of targeted nerve fibers. When the nerve fibers degenerate, it causes an interruption in the transmission of nerve signals. This treatment, when successful, provides significant pain relief for a period ranging from a few days to over a year. The procedure may be repeated when the affected nerves have healed and the pain returns.

=== Nephrectomy ===
Many ADPKD patients experience symptomatic sequelae in consequence of the disease, such as cyst hemorrhage, flank pain, recurrent infections, nephrolithiasis, and symptoms of mass effect (i.e., early satiety, nausea and vomiting, and abdominal discomfort), from their enlarged kidneys. In such cases, nephrectomy can be required due to intractable symptoms or when in the course of preparing for kidney transplantation, the native kidneys are found to impinge upon the true pelvis and preclude the placement of a donor allograft. Additionally, native nephrectomy may be undertaken in the presence of suspected malignancy, as renal cell carcinoma (RCC) is two to three times more likely in the ADPKD population in end-stage kidney disease (ESKD) than in the ESKD patients without ADPKD. Although the indications for nephrectomy in ADPKD may be related to kidney size, the decision to proceed with native nephrectomy is often undertaken on an individual basis, without specific reference to kidney size measurements.

=== Dialysis ===
Two modalities of dialysis can be used in the treatment of ADPKD patients: peritoneal dialysis and hemodialysis. Epidemiological data shows that ADPKD affects 5–13.4% of patients undergoing hemodialysis in Europe and in the United States, and about 3% in Japan. Peritoneal dialysis has usually been contra-indicated in ADPKD patients with large kidney and liver volumes, due to expected physical difficulties in the procedure and possible complications; however, no difference is seen in long-term morbidity between hemodialysis and peritoneal dialysis in ADPKD.

=== Kidney transplant ===
Kidney transplantation is accepted as the preferred treatment for ADPKD patients with ESRD. Among American patients on the kidney-transplant waiting list (as of December 2011), 7256 (8.4%) were listed due to cystic kidney disease and of the 16,055 renal transplants performed in 2011, 2057 (12.8%) were done for patients with cystic kidney disease, with 1,189 from deceased donors and 868 from living donors.

=== Novel Therapies ===
There are several novel therapies currently underway aimed at slowing the progression of disease in APKD. Alternative therapeutic options include water therapy, the use of lipid-lowering agents, antiproliferative analogues, and synthetic peptides.

Water Therapy

Increased water intake downregulates vasopressin activity. As a result, water therapy has been explored as a potential therapeutic intervention for individuals with ADPKD; however, studies examining its role in ADPKD advancement remain unclear.

HMG-CoA reductase inhibitors

The progression of ADPKD leads to a decline in kidney function, with a marked decrease in glomerular filtration rate. As a result, treatment with statins is recommended by current guidelines for managing chronic kidney disease. The effect of statins on slowing ADPKD is inconclusive, with some trials showing a decrease in total kidney volume, while others showed no benefit on either total kidney volume or glomerular filtration rate.

Somatostatin analogs

Somatostatin is are artificial peptide designed to mimic the function of an endogenous hormone that has many regulatory functions within the body, including restraining cell proliferation. Small phase 2 studies have shown that somatostatin analogues are effective at reducing the rate of total kidney volume growth and preserving glomerular filtration rate. The use of somatostatin analogues may be restricted due to their side effects, which commonly include gastrointestinal issues such as diarrhea, abdominal discomfort, and gas, as well as conditions like gallstones and elevated blood sugar.

Anti-proliferative agents

Proliferation of epithelial cells lining the cyst results in cyst expansion and contributes to disease progression. As a result of this mechanism, antiproliferative agents such as tyrosine kinase inhibitor bosutinib. However, results in clinical trials have shown mixed results, with studies showing a decrease in total kidney volume.

== Prognosis ==
In ADPKD patients, gradual cyst development and expansion result in kidney enlargement, and during the disease, glomerular filtration rate remains normal for decades before kidney function starts to progressively deteriorate, making early prediction of renal outcome difficult. The CRISP study, mentioned in the treatment section above, contributed to build a strong rationale supporting the prognostic value of total kidney volume (TKV) in ADPKD; TKV (evaluated by MRI) increases steadily and a higher rate of kidney enlargement correlated with accelerated decline of GFR, while patient height-adjusted TKV (HtTKV) ≥600 ml/m predicts the development of stage 3 chronic kidney disease within 8 years.

Besides TKV and HtTKV, the estimated glomerular filtration rate (eGFR) has also been tentatively used to predict the progression of ADPKD. After the analysis of CT or MRI scans of 590 patients with ADPKD treated at the Mayo Translational Polycystic Kidney Disease Center, Irazabal and colleagues developed an imaging-based classification system to predict the rate of eGFR decline in patients with ADPKD. In this prognostic method, patients are divided into five subclasses of estimated kidney growth rates according to age-specific HtTKV ranges (1A, <1.5%; 1B, 1.5–3.0%; 1C, 3.0–4.5%; 1D, 4.5–6.0%; and 1E, >6.0%) as delineated in the CRISP study. The decline in eGFR over the years following initial TKV measurement is significantly different between all five patient subclasses, with those in subclass 1E having the most rapid decline. Some of the most common causes of death in patients with ADPKD are various infections (25%), a ruptured berry aneurysm (15%), or coronary/hypertensive heart disease (40%).
