= Polycystin 1 =

Family of transport proteins

PKD1
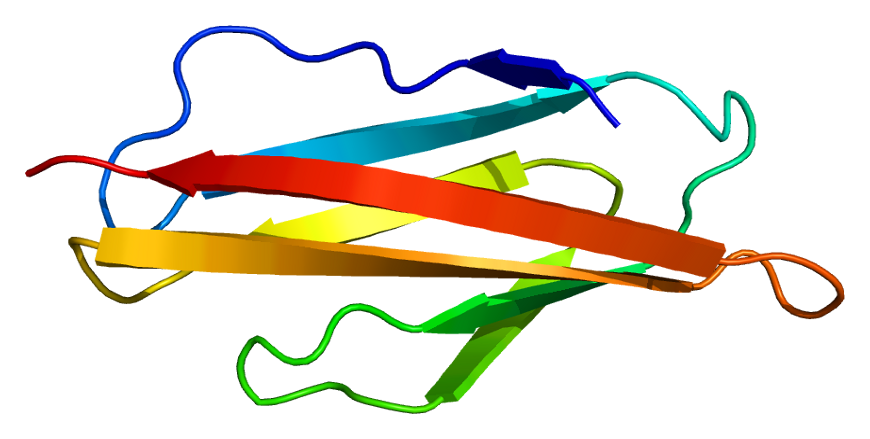

Identifiers
- Aliases: PKD1, PBP, Pc-1, TRPP1, polycystin 1, transient receptor potential channel interacting, PC1
- External IDs: OMIM: 601313; MGI: 97603; GeneCards: PKD1
Available structures
PDB	Ortholog search: PDBe RCSB
PDB	List of PDB id codes 1B4R

Gene location (Human)
Chr.	Chromosome 16 (human)
Band	16p13.3	Start	2,088,708 bp
Band	16p13.3	End	2,135,898 bp

Gene location (Mouse)
Chr.	Chromosome 17 (mouse)
Band	17 A3.3|17 12.4 cM	Start	24,549,834 bp
Band	17 A3.3|17 12.4 cM	End	24,596,508 bp
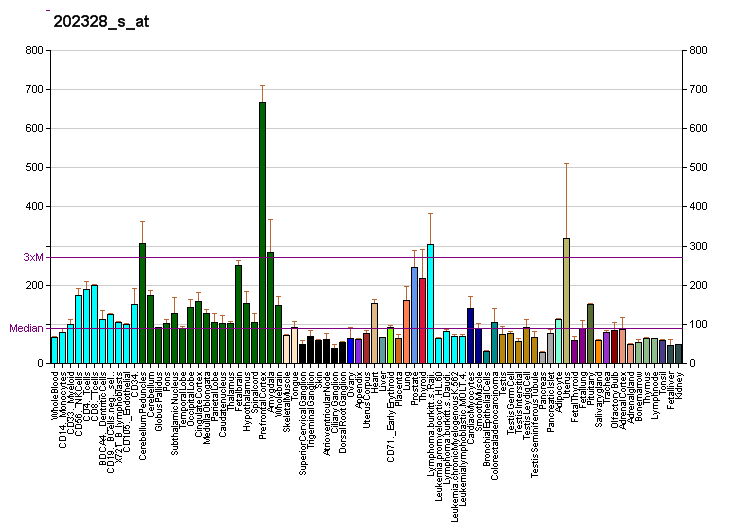

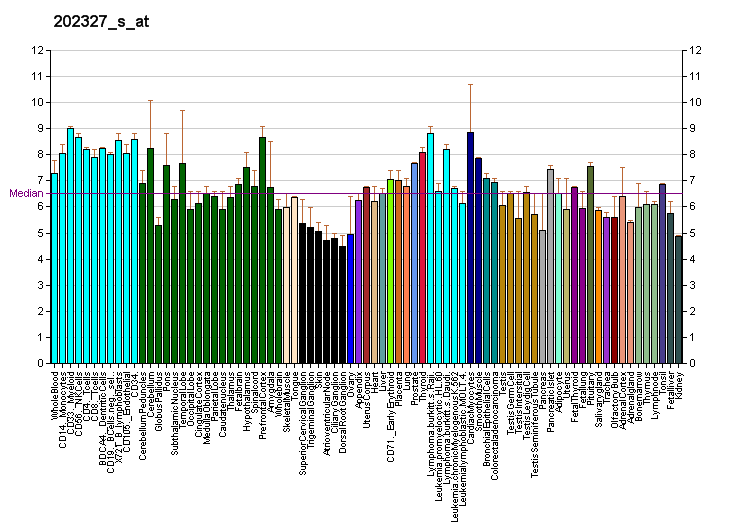

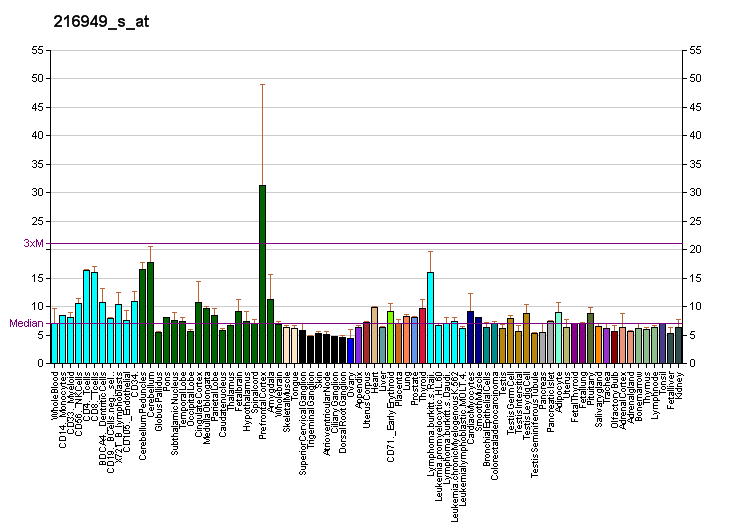
RNA expression pattern
Bgee	Human / Mouse (ortholog); Top expressed in: right hemisphere of cerebellum; anterior pituitary; right frontal lobe; gastric mucosa; ascending aorta; Descending thoracic aorta; muscle layer of sigmoid colon; body of uterus; right coronary artery; popliteal artery / Top expressed in: cerebellar cortex; layer of retina; neural layer of retina; primary visual cortex; hypothalamus; superior frontal gyrus; islet of Langerhans; uterus; olfactory bulb; striatum of neuraxis; More reference expression data
BioGPS	More reference expression data
Gene ontology
Molecular function	transmembrane transporter binding; protein domain specific binding; calcium channel activity; protein binding; protein kinase binding; carbohydrate binding
Cellular component	cytoplasm; integral component of membrane; Golgi apparatus; cell projection; lateral plasma membrane; membrane; Golgi membrane; plasma membrane; integral component of plasma membrane; cilium; cell surface; basolateral plasma membrane; ciliary membrane; Golgi-associated vesicle membrane; extracellular exosome; nucleus; polycystin complex; motile cilium
Biological process	calcium-independent cell-matrix adhesion; calcium ion transport; regulation of proteasomal protein catabolic process; mesonephric tubule development; renal system development; receptor signaling pathway via JAK-STAT; metanephric distal tubule morphogenesis; regulation of mitotic spindle organization; mesonephric duct development; kidney development; cytoplasmic sequestering of transcription factor; positive regulation of cytosolic calcium ion concentration; anatomical structure morphogenesis; placenta blood vessel development; embryonic placenta development; in utero embryonic development; response to fluid shear stress; genitalia development; metanephric ascending thin limb development; metanephric proximal tubule development; development of the heart; cartilage development; regulation of cell adhesion; nitrogen compound metabolic process; blood vessel development; calcium ion transmembrane transport; peptidyl-serine phosphorylation; lymph vessel morphogenesis; neural tube development; protein export from nucleus; detection of mechanical stimulus; establishment of cell polarity; spinal cord development; metanephric collecting duct development; liver development; positive regulation of protein binding; digestive tract development; cell-matrix adhesion; lung epithelium development; branching morphogenesis of an epithelial tube; cartilage condensation; positive regulation of transcription by RNA polymerase II; skin development; homophilic cell adhesion via plasma membrane adhesion molecules; cell-cell adhesion
Sources:Amigo / QuickGO
Orthologs
Databases	NCBI: entry; OMA: entry
Species	Human	Mouse
Entrez	5310	18763
Ensembl	ENSG00000008710	ENSMUSG00000032855
UniProt	P98161	O08852
RefSeq (mRNA)	NM_000296; NM_001009944	NM_013630
RefSeq (protein)	NP_000287; NP_001009944	NP_038658
Location (UCSC)	Chr 16: 2.09 – 2.14 Mb	Chr 17: 24.55 – 24.6 Mb
PubMed search
- Wikidata
View/Edit Human	View/Edit Mouse

Polycystin 1 (PC1) is a protein that in humans is encoded by the PKD1 gene. Mutations of PKD1 are associated with most cases of autosomal dominant polycystic kidney disease, a severe hereditary disorder of the kidneys characterised by the development of renal cysts and severe kidney dysfunction.

== Protein structure and function ==
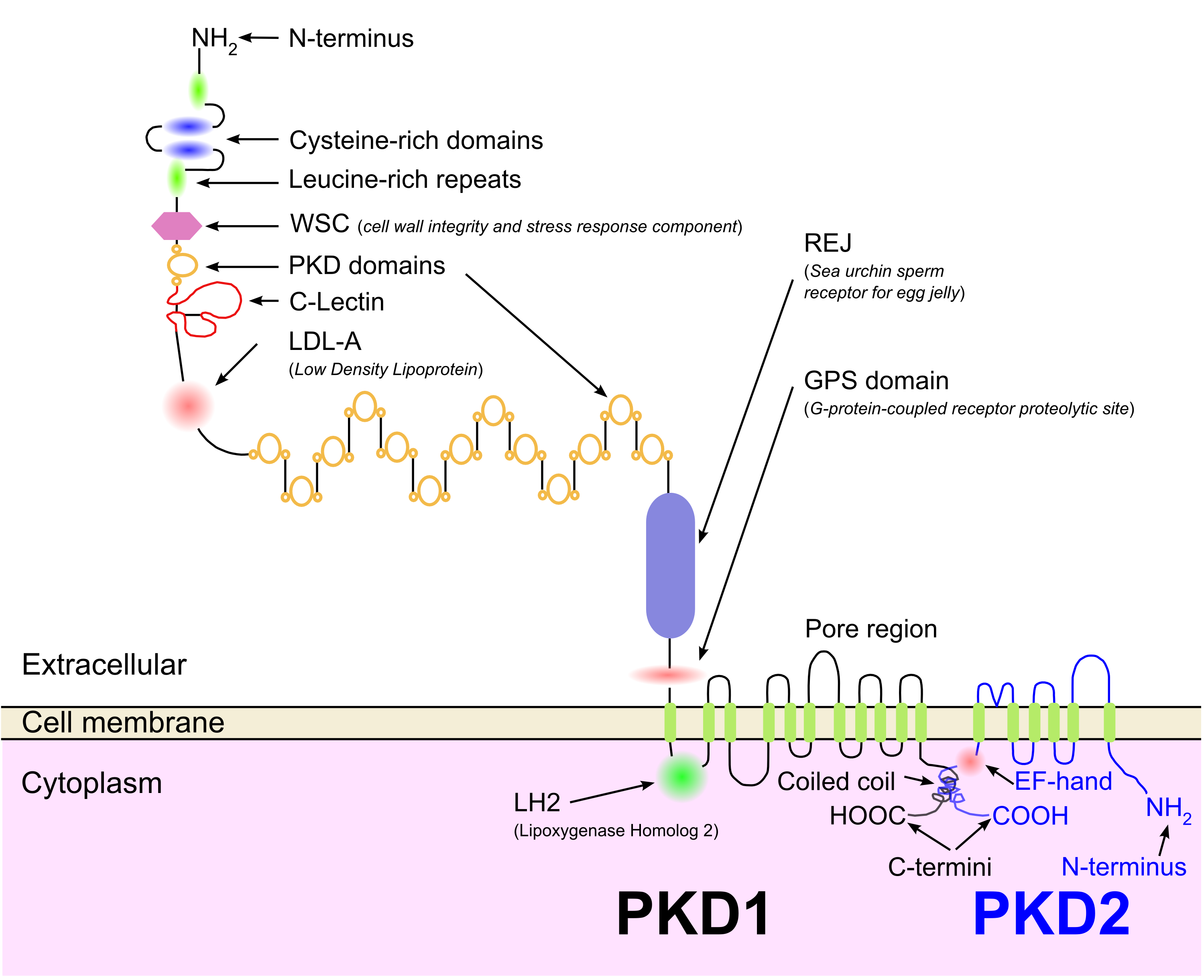
PC1 interacts with polycystin 2 by a cytoplasmic coiled-coil domain.

PC1 is a membrane-bound protein 4303 amino acids in length expressed largely upon the primary cilium, as well as apical membranes, adherens junctions, and desmosomes. It has 11 transmembrane domains, a large extracellular N-terminal domain, and a short (about 200 amino acid) cytoplasmic C-terminal domain. This intracellular domain contains a coiled-coil domain through which PC1 interacts with polycystin 2 (PC2), a membrane-bound Ca^{2+}-permeable ion channel.

PC1 has been proposed to act as a G protein–coupled receptor. The C-terminal domain may be cleaved in a number of different ways. In one instance, a ~35 kDa portion of the tail has been found to accumulate in the cell nucleus in response to decreased fluid flow in the mouse kidney. In another instance, a 15 kDa fragment may be yielded, interacting with transcriptional activator and co-activator STAT6 and p100, or components of the canonical Wnt signaling pathway in an inhibitory manner.

The structure of the human PKD1-PKD2 complex has been solved by cryo-electron microscopy, which showed a 1:3 ratio of PKD1 and PKD2 in the structure. PKD1 consists of a voltage-gated ion channel fold that interacts with PKD2.

PC1 mediates mechanosensation of fluid flow by the primary cilium in the renal epithelium and of mechanical deformation of articular cartilage.

== Gene ==
Splice variants encoding different isoforms have been noted for PKD1. The gene is closely linked to six pseudogenes in a known duplicated region on chromosome 16p.
