= Polycystin 2 =

Protein and coding gene in humans

PKD2
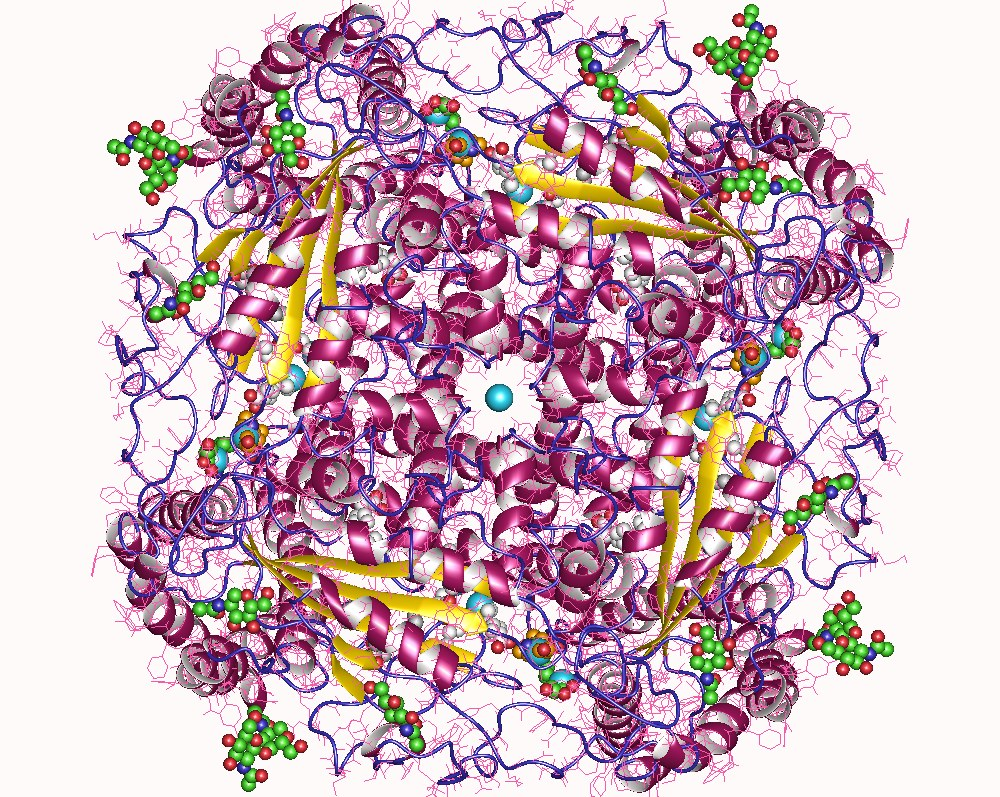

Identifiers
- Aliases: PKD2, APC2, PKD4, Pc-2, TRPP2, Polycystic kidney disease 2, polycystin 2, transient receptor potential cation channel
- External IDs: OMIM: 173910; MGI: 1099818; GeneCards: PKD2
Available structures
PDB	Ortholog search: PDBe RCSB
PDB	List of PDB id codes 2KLD, 2KLE, 2KQ6, 2Y4Q, 3HRN, 3HRO

Gene location (Human)
Chr.	Chromosome 4 (human)
Band	4q22.1	Start	88,007,635 bp
Band	4q22.1	End	88,077,777 bp

Gene location (Mouse)
Chr.	Chromosome 5 (mouse)
Band	5 E5|5 50.68 cM	Start	104,607,316 bp
Band	5 E5|5 50.68 cM	End	104,653,685 bp
RNA expression pattern
Bgee	Human / Mouse (ortholog); Top expressed in: Achilles tendon; saphenous vein; renal medulla; ascending aorta; synovial joint; Descending thoracic aorta; germinal epithelium; myometrium; right coronary artery; stromal cell of endometrium / Top expressed in: ciliary body; iris; internal carotid artery; Paneth cell; vestibular membrane of cochlear duct; external carotid artery; calvaria; semi-lunar valve; condyle; Epithelium of choroid plexus; More reference expression data
BioGPS	n/a
Gene ontology
Molecular function	transmembrane transporter binding; cytoskeletal protein binding; signaling receptor binding; muscle alpha-actinin binding; metal ion binding; HLH domain binding; voltage-gated cation channel activity; protein homodimerization activity; calcium-induced calcium release activity; channel activity; protein binding; actinin binding; voltage-gated calcium channel activity; calcium channel activity; phosphoprotein binding; alpha-actinin binding; identical protein binding; ATPase binding; calcium ion binding; outward rectifier potassium channel activity; voltage-gated sodium channel activity; voltage-gated potassium channel activity; potassium channel activity; voltage-gated ion channel activity
Cellular component	filamentous actin; membrane; integral component of cytoplasmic side of endoplasmic reticulum membrane; cell projection; extracellular exosome; lamellipodium; integral component of membrane; basal plasma membrane; integral component of lumenal side of endoplasmic reticulum membrane; ciliary membrane; polycystin complex; cilium; plasma membrane; cell-cell junction; ciliary basal body; endoplasmic reticulum; basal cortex; mitotic spindle; cytoplasm; motile cilium; non-motile cilium; integral component of plasma membrane; endoplasmic reticulum membrane; basolateral plasma membrane; cytoplasmic vesicle membrane; cytoplasmic vesicle
Biological process	regulation of calcium ion import; cellular response to osmotic stress; negative regulation of G1/S transition of mitotic cell cycle; heart looping; metanephric S-shaped body morphogenesis; negative regulation of cell population proliferation; mesonephric tubule development; renal system development; metanephric cortex development; kidney development; cytoplasmic sequestering of transcription factor; ion transport; metanephric ascending thin limb development; branching involved in ureteric bud morphogenesis; neural tube development; spinal cord development; metanephric distal tubule development; centrosome duplication; cellular calcium ion homeostasis; determination of liver left/right asymmetry; cellular response to fluid shear stress; aorta development; cellular response to hydrostatic pressure; metanephric mesenchyme development; renal artery morphogenesis; metanephric cortical collecting duct development; mesonephric duct development; positive regulation of cytosolic calcium ion concentration; positive regulation of nitric oxide biosynthetic process; cellular response to reactive oxygen species; positive regulation of gene expression; metanephric part of ureteric bud development; regulation of cell population proliferation; metanephric smooth muscle tissue development; positive regulation of inositol 1,4,5-trisphosphate-sensitive calcium-release channel activity; positive regulation of transcription by RNA polymerase II; development of the heart; receptor signaling pathway via JAK-STAT; detection of mechanical stimulus; embryonic placenta development; detection of nodal flow; liver development; placenta blood vessel development; renal tubule morphogenesis; determination of left/right symmetry; regulation of postsynaptic membrane potential; negative regulation of ryanodine-sensitive calcium-release channel activity; calcium ion transport; release of sequestered calcium ion into cytosol; calcium ion transmembrane transport; cellular response to calcium ion; sodium ion transmembrane transport; protein homotetramerization; cellular response to cAMP; potassium ion transmembrane transport; potassium ion transport; regulation of ion transmembrane transport; transport
Sources:Amigo / QuickGO
Orthologs
Databases	NCBI: entry; OMA: entry
Species	Human	Mouse
Entrez	5311	18764
Ensembl	ENSG00000118762	ENSMUSG00000034462
UniProt	Q13563	O35245
RefSeq (mRNA)	NM_000297	NM_008861
RefSeq (protein)	NP_000288	NP_032887
Location (UCSC)	Chr 4: 88.01 – 88.08 Mb	Chr 5: 104.61 – 104.65 Mb
PubMed search
- Wikidata
View/Edit Human	View/Edit Mouse

Polycystin-2 (PC2) is a protein that in humans is encoded by the PKD2 gene.

The gene PKD2 also known as TRPP2, encodes a member of the polycystin protein family, called TRPP, and contains multiple transmembrane domains, and cytoplasmic N- and C-termini. The protein may be an integral membrane protein involved in cell-cell/matrix interactions. TRPP2 may function in renal tubular development, morphology, and function, and may modulate intracellular calcium homeostasis and other signal transduction pathways. This protein interacts with polycystin 1 (TRPP1) to produce cation-permeable currents. It was discovered by Stefan Somlo at Yale University.

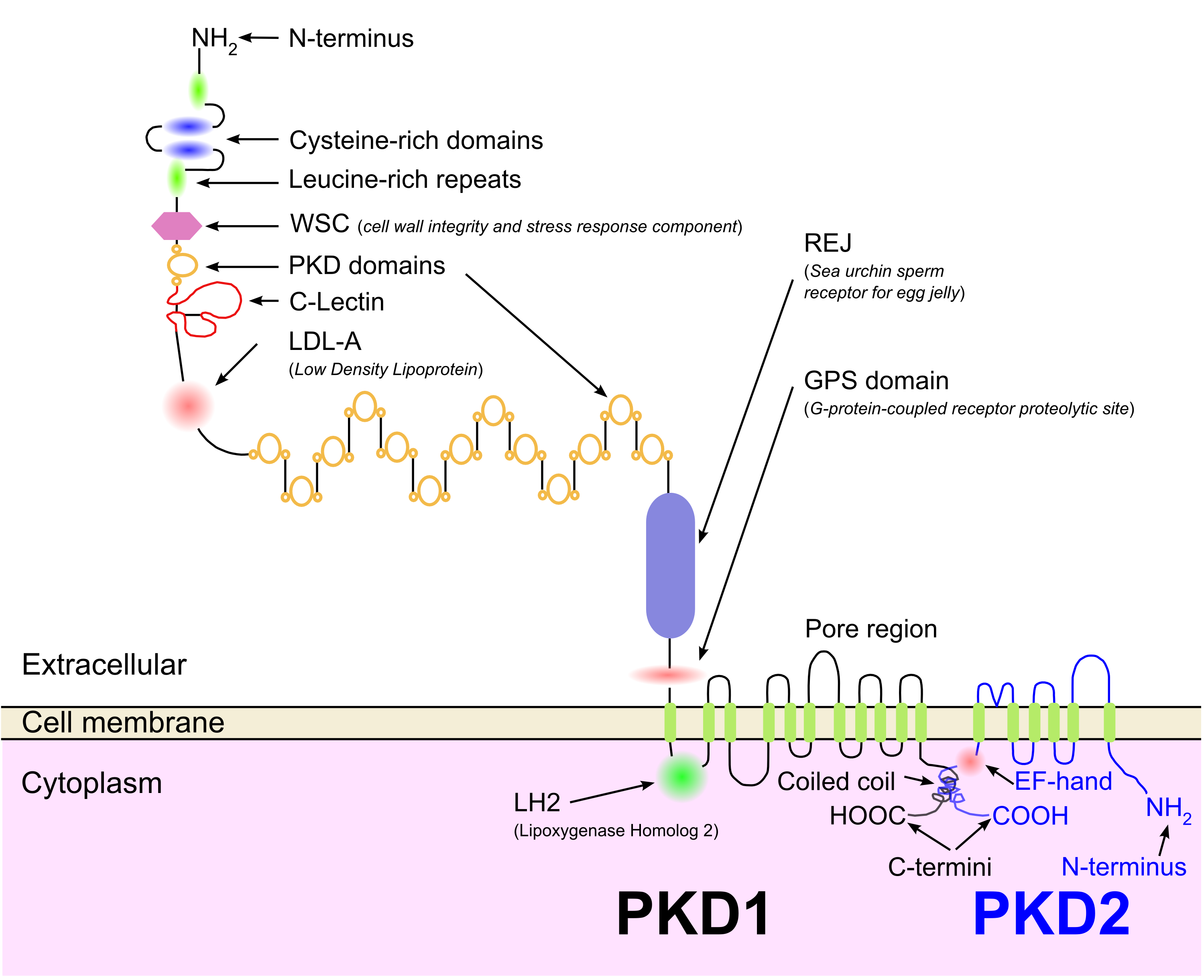
Illustration of PKD1 and PKD2 proteins at the cell membrane

== Clinical significance ==
Mutations in this gene have been associated with autosomal dominant polycystic kidney disease.

== Interactions ==
Polycystin 2 has been shown to interact with the proteins TRPC1, PKD1 and TNNI3.

== See also ==
- HAX1
- TRPP
