= EVC =

EVC may refer to:

- Eastern Valley Conference, a defunct American high school athletics conference
- Ecological vegetation class
- Economic value to the customer
- Eden Village Camp, a Jewish summer camp in New York state
- Electric Vehicle Company
- Ellis–van Creveld syndrome
- Emily VanCamp, a Canadian actress
- Enchanted Valley Carnival, an Indian music festival
- Entravision Communications, an American media company
- Essential Video Coding, video coding standard
- Ethernet virtual connection
- European Video Corporation
- European Vital Computer, in the European Train Control System
- EVC (gene)
- Evergreen Valley College, a community college in San Jose, California
- Everybody Votes Channel, a channel for the Nintendo Wii
- VESA Enhanced Video Connector
