= Human genetic variation =

Genetic diversity in human populations

A graphical representation of the typical human karyotype

The human mitochondrial DNA

Human genetic variation is the genetic differences in and among populations. There may be multiple variants of any given gene in the human population (alleles), a situation called polymorphism.

No two humans are genetically identical. Even monozygotic twins (who develop from one zygote) have infrequent genetic differences due to mutations occurring during development and gene copy-number variation. Differences between individuals, even closely related individuals, are the key to techniques such as genetic fingerprinting.

The human genome has a total length of approximately 3.2 billion base pairs (bp) in 46 chromosomes of DNA as well as slightly under 17,000 bp DNA in cellular mitochondria. In 2015, the typical difference between an individual's genome and the reference genome was estimated at 20 million base pairs (or 0.6% of the total). As of 2017, there were a total of 324 million known variants from sequenced human genomes.

Comparatively speaking, humans are a genetically homogeneous species. Although a small number of genetic variants are found more frequently in certain geographic regions or in people with ancestry from those regions, this variation accounts for a small portion (~15%) of human genome variability. The majority of variation exists within the members of each human population. For comparison, rhesus macaques exhibit 2.5-fold greater DNA sequence diversity compared to humans. These rates differ depending on what macromolecules are being analyzed. Chimpanzees have more genetic variance than humans when examining nuclear DNA, but humans have more genetic variance when examining at the level of proteins.

The lack of discontinuities in genetic distances between human populations, absence of discrete branches in the human species, and striking homogeneity of human beings globally, imply that there is no scientific basis for inferring races or subspecies in humans, and for most traits, there is much more variation within populations than between them. Despite this, modern genetic studies have found substantial average genetic differences across human populations in traits such as skin colour, bodily dimensions, lactose and starch digestion, high altitude adaptions, drug response, taste receptors, and predisposition to developing particular diseases. The greatest diversity is found within and among populations in Africa, and gradually declines with increasing distance from the African continent, consistent with the Out of Africa theory of human origins.

The study of human genetic variation has evolutionary significance and medical applications. It can help scientists reconstruct and understand patterns of past human migration. In medicine, study of human genetic variation may be important because some disease-causing alleles occur more often in certain population groups. For instance, the mutation for sickle-cell anemia is more often found in people with ancestry from certain sub-Saharan African, south European, Arabian, and Indian populations, due to the evolutionary pressure from mosquitos carrying malaria in these regions.

New findings show that each human has on average 60 new mutations compared to their parents.

== Causes of variation ==
Causes of differences between individuals include independent assortment, the exchange of genes (crossing over and recombination) during reproduction (through meiosis) and various mutational events.

There are at least three reasons why genetic variation exists between populations. Natural selection may confer an adaptive advantage to individuals in a specific environment if an allele provides a competitive advantage. Alleles under selection are likely to occur only in those geographic regions where they confer an advantage. A second important process is genetic drift, which is the effect of random changes in the gene pool, under conditions where most mutations are neutral (that is, they do not appear to have any positive or negative selective effect on the organism). Finally, small migrant populations have statistical differences – called the founder effect – from the overall populations where they originated; when these migrants settle new areas, their descendant population typically differs from their population of origin: different genes predominate and it is less genetically diverse.

In humans, the main cause is genetic drift. Serial founder effects and past small population size (increasing the likelihood of genetic drift) may have had an important influence in neutral differences between populations. The second main cause of genetic variation is due to the high degree of neutrality of most mutations. A small, but significant number of genes appear to have undergone recent natural selection, and these selective pressures are sometimes specific to one region.

== Measures of variation ==
Genetic variation among humans occurs on many scales, from gross alterations in the human karyotype to single nucleotide changes. Chromosome abnormalities are detected in 1 of 160 live human births. Apart from sex chromosome disorders, most cases of aneuploidy result in death of the developing fetus (miscarriage); the most common extra autosomal chromosomes among live births are 21, 18 and 13.

Nucleotide diversity is the average proportion of nucleotides that differ between two individuals. As of 2004, the human nucleotide diversity was estimated to be 0.1% to 0.4% of base pairs. In 2015, the 1000 Genomes Project, which sequenced one thousand individuals from 26 human populations, found that "a typical [individual] genome differs from the reference human genome at 4.1 million to 5.0 million sites … affecting 20 million bases of sequence"; the latter figure corresponds to 0.6% of total number of base pairs. Nearly all (>99.9%) of these sites are small differences, either single nucleotide polymorphisms or brief insertions or deletions (indels) in the genetic sequence, but structural variations account for a greater number of base-pairs than the SNPs and indels.

As of 2017, the Single Nucleotide Polymorphism Database (dbSNP), which lists SNP and other variants, listed 324 million variants found in sequenced human genomes.

=== Single nucleotide polymorphisms ===
DNA molecule 1 differs from DNA molecule 2 at a single base-pair location (a C/T polymorphism).

A single nucleotide polymorphism (SNP) is a difference in a single nucleotide between members of one species that occurs in at least 1% of the population. The 2,504 individuals characterized by the 1000 Genomes Project had 84.7 million SNPs among them. SNPs are the most common type of sequence variation, estimated in 1998 to account for 90% of all sequence variants. Other sequence variations are single base exchanges, deletions and insertions. SNPs occur on average about every 100 to 300 bases and so are the major source of heterogeneity.

A functional, or non-synonymous, SNP is one that affects some factor such as gene splicing or messenger RNA, and so causes a phenotypic difference between members of the species. About 3% to 5% of human SNPs are functional (see International HapMap Project). Neutral, or synonymous SNPs are still useful as genetic markers in genome-wide association studies, because of their sheer number and the stable inheritance over generations.

A coding SNP is one that occurs inside a gene. There are 105 Human Reference SNPs that result in premature stop codons in 103 genes. This corresponds to 0.5% of coding SNPs. They occur due to segmental duplication in the genome. These SNPs result in loss of protein, yet all these SNP alleles are common and are not purified in negative selection.

=== Structural variation ===
Structural variation is the variation in structure of an organism's chromosome. Structural variations, such as copy-number variation and deletions, inversions, insertions and duplications, account for much more human genetic variation than single nucleotide diversity. This was concluded in 2007 from analysis of the diploid full sequences of the genomes of two humans: Craig Venter and James D. Watson. This added to the two haploid sequences which were amalgamations of sequences from many individuals, published by the Human Genome Project and Celera Genomics respectively.

According to the 1000 Genomes Project, a typical human has 2,100 to 2,500 structural variations, which include approximately 1,000 large deletions, 160 copy-number variants, 915 Alu insertions, 128 L1 insertions, 51 SVA insertions, 4 NUMTs, and 10 inversions.

==== Copy number variation ====
A copy-number variation (CNV) is a difference in the genome due to deleting or duplicating large regions of DNA on some chromosome. It is estimated that 0.4% of the genomes of unrelated humans differ with respect to copy number. When copy number variation is included, human-to-human genetic variation is estimated to be at least 0.5% (99.5% similarity). Copy number variations are inherited but can also arise during development.

A visual map with the regions with high genomic variation of the modern-human reference assembly relatively to a Neanderthal of 50k has been built by Pratas et al.

=== Epigenetics ===
Epigenetic variation is variation in the chemical tags that attach to DNA and affect how genes get read. The tags, "called epigenetic markings, act as switches that control how genes can be read." At some alleles, the epigenetic state of the DNA, and associated phenotype, can be inherited across generations of individuals.

=== Genetic variability ===
Genetic variability is a measure of the tendency of individual genotypes in a population to vary (become different) from one another. Variability is different from genetic diversity, which is the amount of variation seen in a particular population. The variability of a trait is how much that trait tends to vary in response to environmental and genetic influences.

=== Clines ===
In biology, a cline is a continuum of species, populations, varieties, or forms of organisms that exhibit gradual phenotypic and/or genetic differences over a geographical area, typically as a result of environmental heterogeneity. In the scientific study of human genetic variation, a gene cline can be rigorously defined and subjected to quantitative metrics.

=== Haplogroups ===
In the study of molecular evolution, a haplogroup is a group of similar haplotypes that share a common ancestor with a single nucleotide polymorphism (SNP) mutation. The study of haplogroups provides information about ancestral origins dating back thousands of years.

The most commonly studied human haplogroups are Y-chromosome (Y-DNA) haplogroups and mitochondrial DNA (mtDNA) haplogroups, both of which can be used to define genetic populations. Y-DNA is passed solely along the patrilineal line, from father to son, while mtDNA is passed down the matrilineal line, from mother to both daughter or son. The Y-DNA and mtDNA may change by chance mutation at each generation.

=== Variable number tandem repeats ===
A variable number tandem repeat (VNTR) is the variation of length of a tandem repeat. A tandem repeat is the adjacent repetition of a short nucleotide sequence. Tandem repeats exist on many chromosomes, and their length varies between individuals. Each variant acts as an inherited allele, so they are used for personal or parental identification. Their analysis is useful in genetics and biology research, forensics, and DNA fingerprinting.

Short tandem repeats (about 5 base pairs) are called microsatellites, while longer ones are called minisatellites.

== History and geographic distribution ==
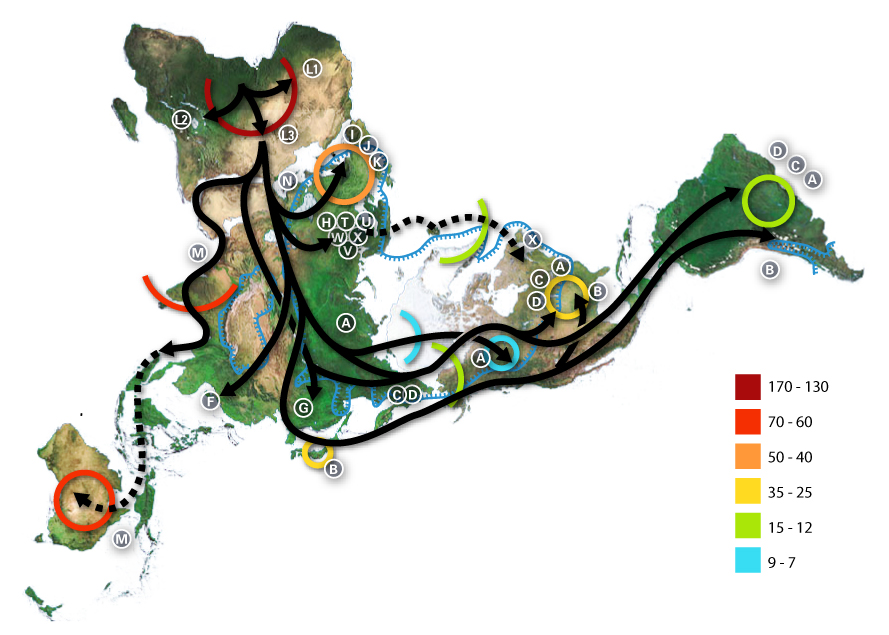
Map of the migration of modern humans out of Africa, based on mitochondrial DNA. Colored rings indicate thousand years before present.

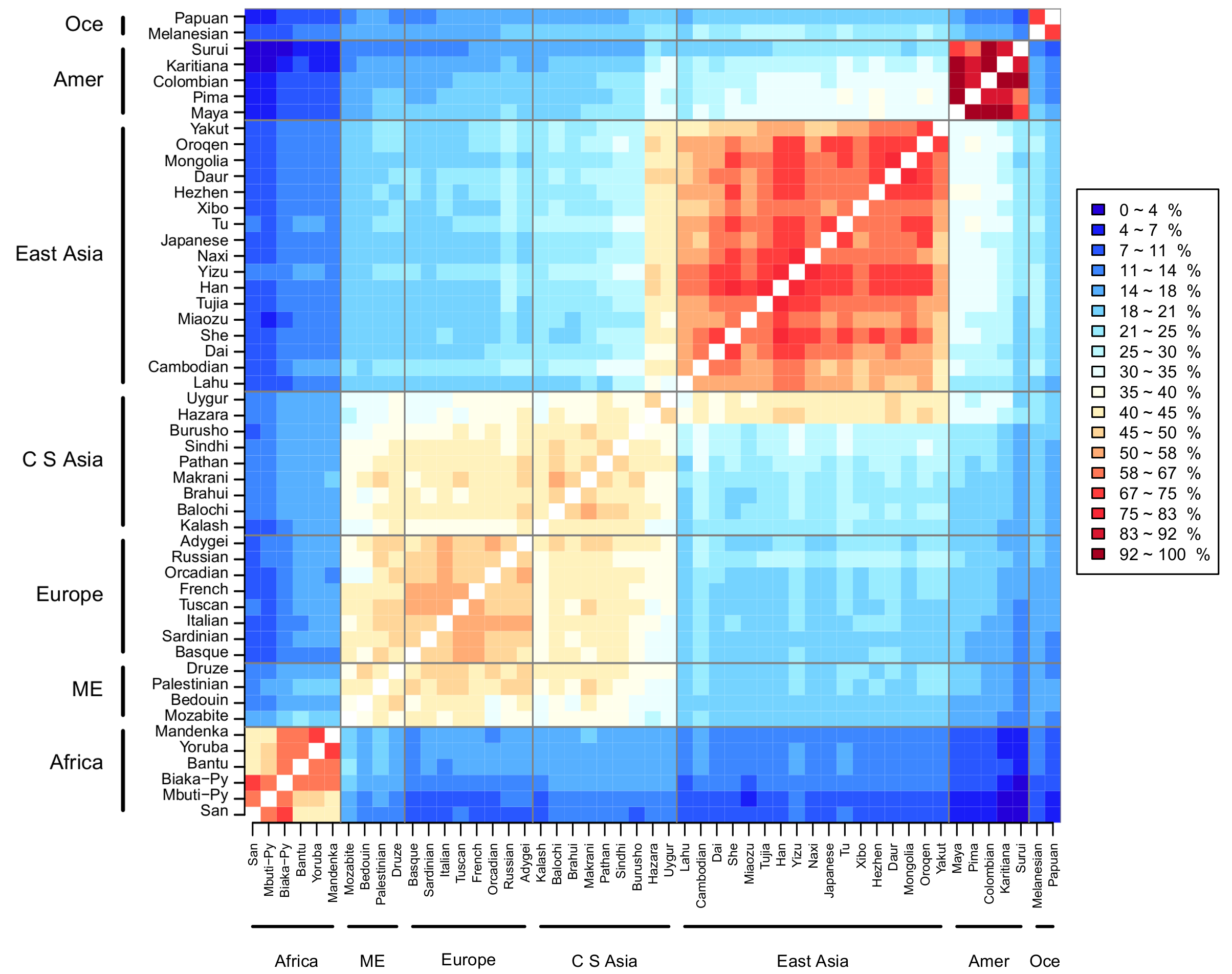
Genetic distance map by Magalhães et al. (2012)

=== Recent African origin of modern humans ===
The recent African origin of modern humans paradigm assumes the dispersal of non-African populations of anatomically modern humans after 70,000 years ago. Dispersal within Africa occurred significantly earlier, at least 130,000 years ago. The "out of Africa" theory originates in the 19th century, as a tentative suggestion in Charles Darwin's Descent of Man, but remained speculative until the 1980s when it was supported by the study of present-day mitochondrial DNA, combined with evidence from physical anthropology of archaic specimens.

According to a 2000 study of Y-chromosome sequence variation, human Y-chromosomes trace ancestry to Africa, and the descendants of the derived lineage left Africa and eventually were replaced by archaic human Y-chromosomes in Eurasia. The study also shows that a minority of contemporary populations in East Africa and the Khoisan are the descendants of the most ancestral patrilineages of anatomically modern humans that left Africa 35,000 to 89,000 years ago. Other evidence supporting the theory is that variations in skull measurements decrease with distance from Africa at the same rate as the decrease in genetic diversity. Human genetic diversity decreases in native populations with migratory distance from Africa, and this is thought to be due to bottlenecks during human migration, which are events that temporarily reduce population size.

A 2009 genetic clustering study, which genotyped 1327 polymorphic markers in various African populations, identified six ancestral clusters. The clustering corresponded closely with ethnicity, culture and language. A 2018 whole genome sequencing study of the world's populations observed similar clusters among the populations in Africa. At K=9, distinct ancestral components defined the Afroasiatic-speaking populations inhabiting North Africa and Northeast Africa; the Nilo-Saharan-speaking populations in Northeast Africa and East Africa; the Ari populations in Northeast Africa; the Niger-Congo-speaking populations in West-Central Africa, West Africa, East Africa and Southern Africa; the Pygmy populations in Central Africa; and the Khoisan populations in Southern Africa.

In May 2023, scientists reported, based on genetic studies, a more complicated pathway of human evolution than previously understood. According to the studies, humans evolved from different places and times in Africa, instead of from a single location and period of time.

=== Population genetics ===
Because of the common ancestry of all humans, only a small number of variants have large differences in frequency between populations. However, some rare variants in the world's human population are much more frequent in at least one population (more than 5%).

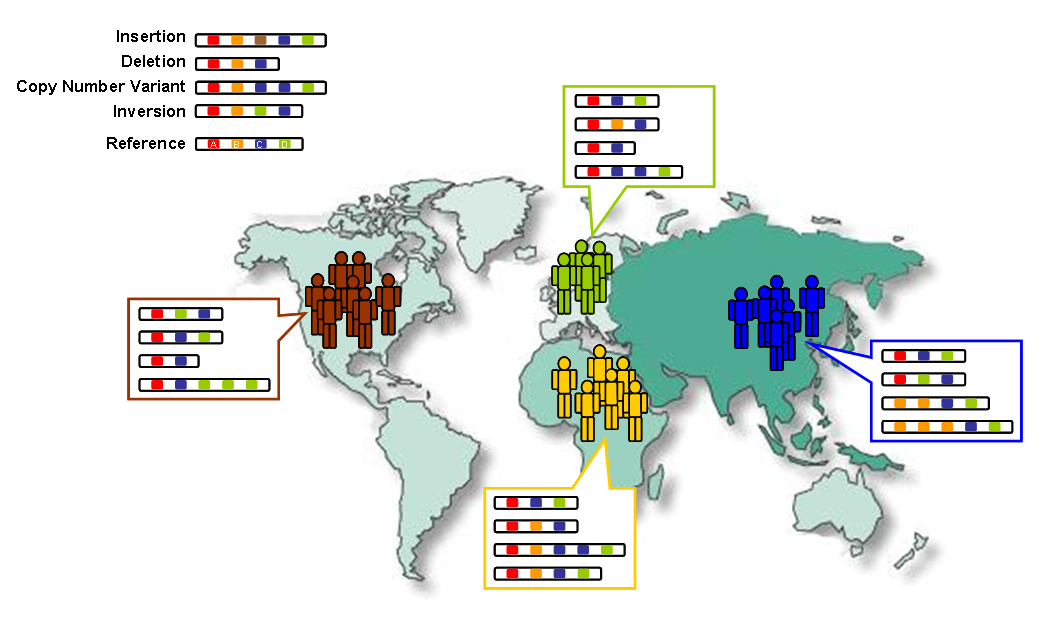
Genetic variation

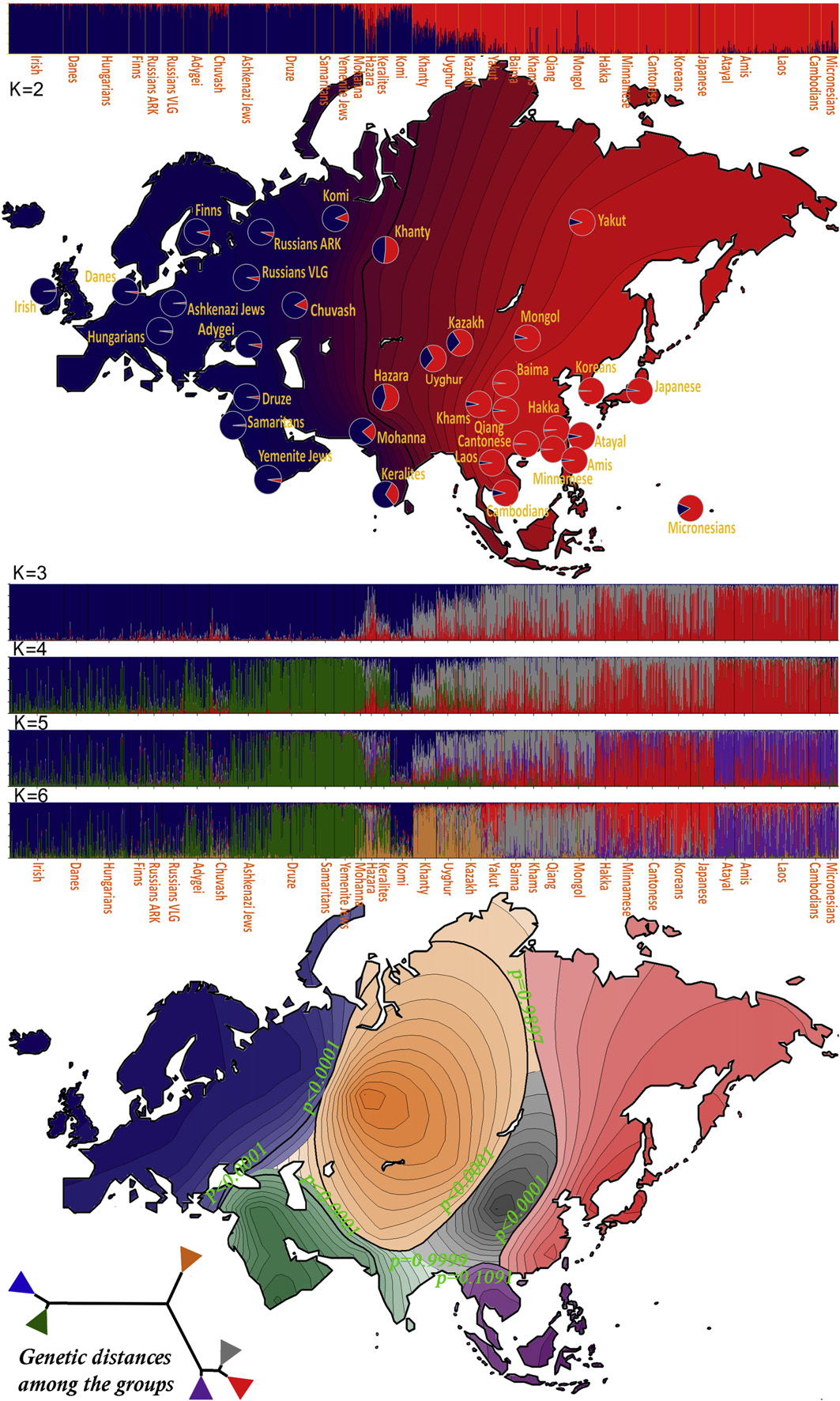
Genetic variation of Eurasian populations showing different frequency of West- and East-Eurasian components

It is commonly assumed that early humans left Africa, and thus must have passed through a population bottleneck before their African-Eurasian divergence around 100,000 years ago (ca. 3,000 generations). The rapid expansion of a previously small population has two important effects on the distribution of genetic variation. First, the so-called founder effect occurs when founder populations bring only a subset of the genetic variation from their ancestral population. Second, as founders become more geographically separated, the probability that two individuals from different founder populations will mate becomes smaller. The effect of this assortative mating is to reduce gene flow between geographical groups and to increase the genetic distance between groups.

The expansion of humans from Africa affected the distribution of genetic variation in two other ways. First, smaller (founder) populations experience greater genetic drift because of increased fluctuations in neutral polymorphisms. Second, new polymorphisms that arose in one group were less likely to be transmitted to other groups as gene flow was restricted.

Populations in Africa tend to have lower amounts of linkage disequilibrium than do populations outside Africa, partly because of the larger size of human populations in Africa over the course of human history and partly because the number of modern humans who left Africa to colonize the rest of the world appears to have been relatively low. In contrast, populations that have undergone dramatic size reductions or rapid expansions in the past and populations formed by the mixture of previously separate ancestral groups can have unusually high levels of linkage disequilibrium

=== Distribution of variation ===
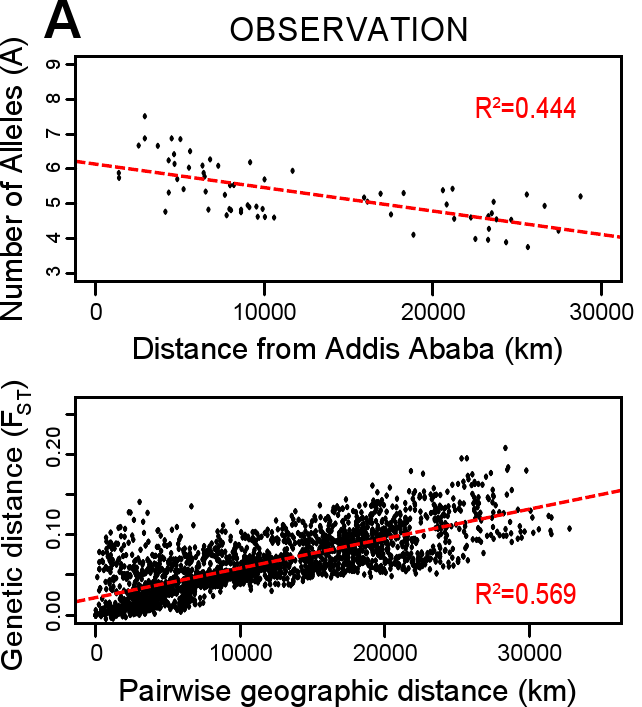
Human genetic variation calculated from genetic data representing 346 microsatellite loci taken from 1484 individuals in 78 human populations. The upper graph illustrates that as populations are further from East Africa, they have declining genetic diversity as measured in average number of microsatellite repeats at each of the loci. The bottom chart illustrates isolation by distance. Populations with a greater distance between them are more dissimilar (as measured by the Fst statistic) than those which are geographically close to one another. The horizontal axis of both charts is geographic distance as measured along likely routes of human migration. (Chart from Kanitz et al. 2018)

The distribution of genetic variants within and among human populations are impossible to describe succinctly because of the difficulty of defining a "population," the clinal nature of variation, and heterogeneity across the genome (Long and Kittles 2003). In general, however, an average of 85% of genetic variation exists within local populations, ~7% is between local populations within the same continent, and ~8% of variation occurs between large groups living on different continents. The recent African origin theory for humans would predict that in Africa there exists a great deal more diversity than elsewhere and that diversity should decrease the further from Africa a population is sampled.

==== Phenotypic variation ====
Sub-Saharan Africa has the most human genetic diversity and the same has been shown to hold true for phenotypic variation in skull form. Phenotype is connected to genotype through gene expression. Genetic diversity decreases smoothly with migratory distance from that region, which many scientists believe to be the origin of modern humans, and that decrease is mirrored by a decrease in phenotypic variation. Skull measurements are an example of a physical attribute whose within-population variation decreases with distance from Africa.

The distribution of many physical traits resembles the distribution of genetic variation within and between human populations (American Association of Physical Anthropologists 1996; Keita and Kittles 1997). For example, ~90% of the variation in human head shapes occurs within continental groups, and ~10% separates groups, with a greater variability of head shape among individuals with recent African ancestors (Relethford 2002).

A prominent exception to the common distribution of physical characteristics within and among groups is skin color. Approximately 10% of the variance in skin color occurs within groups, and ~90% occurs between groups (Relethford 2002). This distribution of skin color and its geographic patterning – with people whose ancestors lived predominantly near the equator having darker skin than those with ancestors who lived predominantly in higher latitudes – indicate that this attribute has been under strong selective pressure. Darker skin appears to be strongly selected for in equatorial regions to prevent sunburn, skin cancer, the photolysis of folate, and damage to sweat glands.

Understanding how genetic diversity in the human population impacts various levels of gene expression is an active area of research. While earlier studies focused on the relationship between DNA variation and RNA expression, more recent efforts are characterizing the genetic control of various aspects of gene expression including chromatin states, translation, and protein levels. A study published in 2007 found that 25% of genes showed different levels of gene expression between populations of European and Asian descent. The primary cause of this difference in gene expression was thought to be SNPs in gene regulatory regions of DNA. Another study published in 2007 found that approximately 83% of genes were expressed at different levels among individuals and about 17% between populations of European and African descent.

===== Wright's fixation index as measure of variation =====
The population geneticist Sewall Wright developed the fixation index (often abbreviated to F_{ST}) as a way of measuring genetic differences between populations. This statistic is often used in taxonomy to compare differences between any two given populations by measuring the genetic differences among and between populations for individual genes, or for many genes simultaneously. It is often stated that the fixation index for humans is about 0.15. This translates to an estimated 85% of the variation measured in the overall human population is found within individuals of the same population, and about 15% of the variation occurs between populations. These estimates imply that any two individuals from different populations may be more similar to each other than either is to a member of their own group. "The shared evolutionary history of living humans has resulted in a high relatedness among all living people, as indicated for example by the very low fixation index (F_{ST}) among living human populations." Richard Lewontin, who affirmed these ratios, thus concluded neither "race" nor "subspecies" were appropriate or useful ways to describe human populations.

Wright himself believed that values >0.25 represent very great genetic variation and that an F_{ST} of 0.15–0.25 represented great variation. However, about 5% of human variation occurs between populations within continents, therefore F_{ST} values between continental groups of humans (or races) of as low as 0.1 (or possibly lower) have been found in some studies, suggesting more moderate levels of genetic variation. Graves (1996) has countered that F_{ST} should not be used as a marker of subspecies status, as the statistic is used to measure the degree of differentiation between populations, although see also Wright (1978).

Jeffrey Long and Rick Kittles give a long critique of the application of F_{ST} to human populations in their 2003 paper "Human Genetic Diversity and the Nonexistence of Biological Races". They find that the figure of 85% is misleading because it implies that all human populations contain on average 85% of all genetic diversity. They argue the underlying statistical model incorrectly assumes equal and independent histories of variation for each large human population. A more realistic approach is to understand that some human groups are parental to other groups and that these groups represent paraphyletic groups to their descent groups. For example, under the recent African origin theory the human population in Africa is paraphyletic to all other human groups because it represents the ancestral group from which all non-African populations derive, but more than that, non-African groups only derive from a small non-representative sample of this African population. This means that all non-African groups are more closely related to each other and to some African groups (probably east Africans) than they are to others, and further that the migration out of Africa represented a genetic bottleneck, with much of the diversity that existed in Africa not being carried out of Africa by the emigrating groups. Under this scenario, human populations do not have equal amounts of local variability, but rather diminished amounts of diversity the further from Africa any population lives. Long and Kittles find that rather than 85% of human genetic diversity existing in all human populations, about 100% of human diversity exists in a single African population, whereas only about 70% of human genetic diversity exists in a population derived from New Guinea. Long and Kittles argued that this still produces a global human population that is genetically homogeneous compared to other mammalian populations.

=== Archaic admixture ===
Anatomically modern humans interbred with Neanderthals during the Middle Paleolithic. In May 2010, the Neanderthal Genome Project presented genetic evidence that interbreeding took place and that a small but significant portion, around 2–4%, of Neanderthal admixture is present in the DNA of modern Eurasians and Oceanians, and nearly absent in sub-Saharan African populations.

Between 4% and 6% of the genome of Melanesians (represented by the Papua New Guinean and Bougainville Islander) appears to derive from Denisovans – a previously unknown hominin which is more closely related to Neanderthals than to Sapiens. It was possibly introduced during the early migration of the ancestors of Melanesians into Southeast Asia. This history of interaction suggests that Denisovans once ranged widely over eastern Asia.

Thus, Melanesians emerge as one of the most archaic-admixed populations, having Denisovan/Neanderthal-related admixture of ~8%.

In a study published in 2013, Jeffrey Wall from University of California studied whole sequence-genome data and found higher rates of introgression in Asians compared to Europeans. Hammer et al. tested the hypothesis that contemporary African genomes have signatures of gene flow with archaic human ancestors and found evidence of archaic admixture in the genomes of some African groups, suggesting that modest amounts of gene flow were widespread throughout time and space during the evolution of anatomically modern humans.

A study published in 2020 found that the Yoruba and Mende populations of West Africa derive between 2% and 19% of their genome from an as-yet unidentified archaic hominin population that likely diverged before the split of modern humans and the ancestors of Neanderthals and Denisovans, potentially making these groups the most archaic-admixed human populations identified yet.

== Categorization of the world population ==
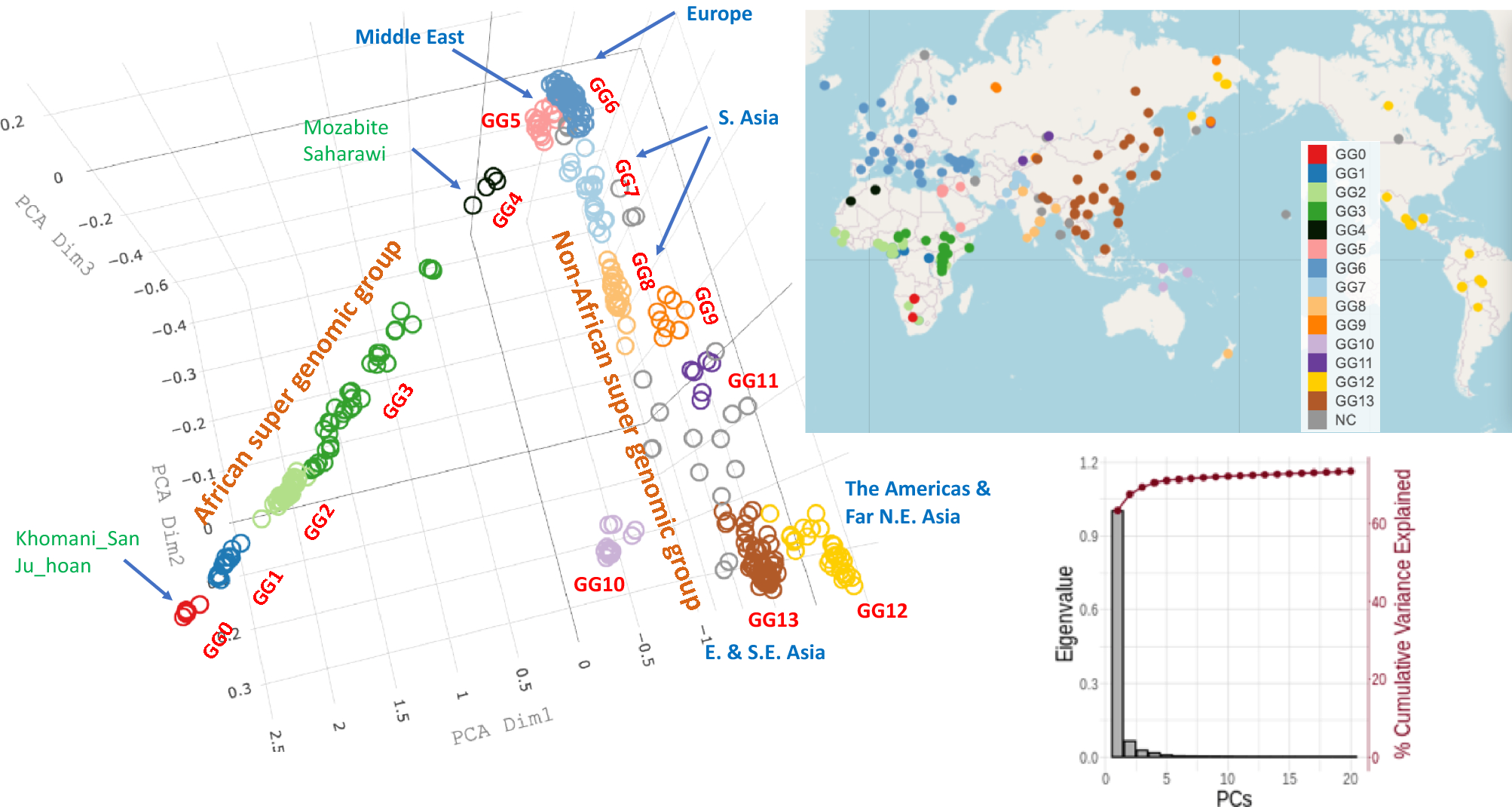
A 2023 whole-genome study of modern-day ethnic groups in the world identified 14 genomic clusters, which do not exactly align with current categorizations of race or ethnicity. The study also found that "99.8% of whole genome is identical between two individuals". Left image shows clustering following principal component analysis with three dimensions. Top right image shows geographical locations where samples were collected.

Individuals mostly have genetic variants which are found in multiple regions of the world. Based on data from "A unified genealogy of modern and ancient genomes".

New data on human genetic variation has reignited the debate about a possible biological basis for categorization of humans into races. Most of the controversy surrounds the question of how to interpret the genetic data and whether conclusions based on it are sound. Some researchers argue that self-identified race can be used as an indicator of geographic ancestry for certain health risks and medications.

Although the genetic differences among human groups are relatively small, these differences in certain genes such as duffy, ABCC11, SLC24A5, called ancestry-informative markers (AIMs) nevertheless can be used to reliably situate many individuals within broad, geographically based groupings. For example, computer analyses of hundreds of polymorphic loci sampled in globally distributed populations have revealed the existence of genetic clustering that roughly is associated with groups that historically have occupied large continental and subcontinental regions (Rosenberg et al. 2002; Bamshad et al. 2003).

Some commentators have argued that these patterns of variation provide a biological justification for the use of traditional racial categories. They argue that the continental clusterings correspond roughly with the division of human beings into sub-Saharan Africans; Europeans, Western Asians, Central Asians, Southern Asians and Northern Africans; Eastern Asians, Southeast Asians, Polynesians, Northern Asians, and Native Americans; and other inhabitants of Oceania (Melanesians, Micronesians & Australian Aborigines) (Risch et al. 2002). Other observers disagree, saying that the same data undercut traditional notions of racial groups (King and Motulsky 2002; Calafell 2003; Tishkoff and Kidd 2004). They point out, for example, that major populations considered races or subgroups within races do not necessarily form their own clusters.

Racial categories are also undermined by findings that genetic variants which are limited to one region tend to be rare within that region, variants that are common within a region tend to be shared across the globe, and most differences between individuals, whether they come from the same region or different regions, are due to global variants. No genetic variants have been found which are fixed within a continent or major region and found nowhere else.

Furthermore, because human genetic variation is clinal, many individuals affiliate with two or more continental groups. Thus, the genetically based "biogeographical ancestry" assigned to any given person generally will be broadly distributed and will be accompanied by sizable uncertainties (Pfaff et al. 2004).

In many parts of the world, groups have mixed in such a way that many individuals have relatively recent ancestors from widely separated regions. Although genetic analyses of large numbers of loci can produce estimates of the percentage of a person's ancestors coming from various continental populations (Shriver et al. 2003; Bamshad et al. 2004), these estimates may assume a false distinctiveness of the parental populations, since human groups have exchanged mates from local to continental scales throughout history (Cavalli-Sforza et al. 1994; Hoerder 2002). Even with large numbers of markers, information for estimating admixture proportions of individuals or groups is limited, and estimates typically will have wide confidence intervals (Pfaff et al. 2004).

=== Genetic clustering ===
Genetic data can be used to infer population structure and assign individuals to groups that often correspond with their self-identified geographical ancestry. Jorde and Wooding (2004) argued that "Analysis of many loci now yields reasonably accurate estimates of genetic similarity among individuals, rather than populations. Clustering of individuals is correlated with geographic origin or ancestry." However, identification by geographic origin may quickly break down when considering historical ancestry shared between individuals back in time.

An analysis of autosomal SNP data from the International HapMap Project (Phase II) and CEPH Human Genome Diversity Panel samples was published in 2009. The study of 53 populations taken from the HapMap and CEPH data (1138 unrelated individuals) suggested that natural selection may shape the human genome much more slowly than previously thought, with factors such as migration within and among continents more heavily influencing the distribution of genetic variations. A similar study published in 2010 found strong genome-wide evidence for selection due to changes in ecoregion, diet, and subsistence particularly in connection with polar ecoregions, with foraging, and with a diet rich in roots and tubers. In a 2016 study, principal component analysis of genome-wide data was capable of recovering previously-known targets for positive selection (without prior definition of populations) as well as a number of new candidate genes.

=== Forensic anthropology ===
Forensic anthropologists can assess the ancestry of skeletal remains by analyzing skeletal morphology as well as using genetic and chemical markers, when possible. While these assessments are never certain, the accuracy of skeletal morphology analyses in determining true ancestry has been estimated at 90%.

Ternary plot showing average admixture of five North American ethnic groups. Individuals that self-identify with each group can be found at many locations on the map, but on average groups tend to cluster differently.

=== Gene flow and admixture ===
Gene flow between two populations reduces the average genetic distance between the populations, only totally isolated human populations experience no gene flow and most populations have continuous gene flow with other neighboring populations which create the clinal distribution observed for most genetic variation. When gene flow takes place between well-differentiated genetic populations the result is referred to as "genetic admixture".

Admixture mapping is a technique used to study how genetic variants cause differences in disease rates between population. Recent admixture populations that trace their ancestry to multiple continents are well suited for identifying genes for traits and diseases that differ in prevalence between parental populations. African-American populations have been the focus of numerous population genetic and admixture mapping studies, including studies of complex genetic traits such as white cell count, body-mass index, prostate cancer and renal disease.

An analysis of phenotypic and genetic variation including skin color and socio-economic status was carried out in the population of Cape Verde which has a well documented history of contact between Europeans and Africans. The studies showed that pattern of admixture in this population has been sex-biased (involving mostly matings between European men and African women) and there is a significant interaction between socioeconomic status and skin color, independent of ancestry. Another study shows an increased risk of graft-versus-host disease complications after transplantation due to genetic variants in human leukocyte antigen (HLA) and non-HLA proteins.

== Impact on gene function and health ==
Given that each individual has millions of genetic variants (compared to the reference genome), it is an important question what impact these variants have on human health or gene function. Most genetic variants have only small to moderate effects, if any. Frequently cited examples include hypertension (Douglas et al. 1996), diabetes, obesity (Fernandez et al. 2003), and prostate cancer (Platz et al. 2000). However, the role of genetic factors in generating these differences remains uncertain.

=== Effect on protein function ===
The human genome encodes about 20,000 protein-coding genes with about 550 amino acids each. Hence, human proteins span about 11 million amino acids (22 million per diploid genome). The median number of missense mutations in individual human genomes is about 8600, that is, two individuals differ by 1 in about 2600 amino acids or in about 20% of their proteins. The average individual has about 137 (predicted) loss of function mutations, including 71 frameshift and 148 in-frame deletions or insertions. Mutations at 32.2% and 9.5% of all possible genomic positions, respectively, can lead to missense and stop-gained variants (i.e., truncated proteins). In a sample of almost 1 million people, almost 5000 genes were identified that had loss-of-function variants in both alleles of the same individual. That is, if these 5000 genes can tolerate homozygous loss of function mutations, they are unlikely to be essential.

=== Monogenetic diseases ===
Differences in allele frequencies contribute to group differences in the incidence of some monogenic diseases, and they may contribute to differences in the incidence of some common diseases. For the monogenic diseases, the frequency of causative alleles usually correlates best with ancestry, whether familial (for example, Ellis–Van Creveld syndrome among the Pennsylvania Amish), ethnic (Tay–Sachs disease among Ashkenazi Jewish populations), or geographical (hemoglobinopathies among people with ancestors who lived in malarial regions). To the extent that ancestry corresponds with racial or ethnic groups or subgroups, the incidence of monogenic diseases can differ between groups categorized by race or ethnicity, and health-care professionals typically take these patterns into account in making diagnoses.

=== Beneficial variants ===
Some other variations on the other hand are beneficial to human, as they prevent certain diseases and increase the chance to adapt to the environment. For example, mutation in CCR5 gene that protects against AIDS. CCR5 gene is absent on the surface of cell due to mutation. Without CCR5 gene on the surface, there is nothing for HIV viruses to grab on and bind into. Therefore, the mutation on CCR5 gene decreases the chance of an individual's risk with AIDS. The mutation in CCR5 is also quite common in certain areas, with more than 14% of the population carry the mutation in Europe and about 6–10% in Asia and North Africa.

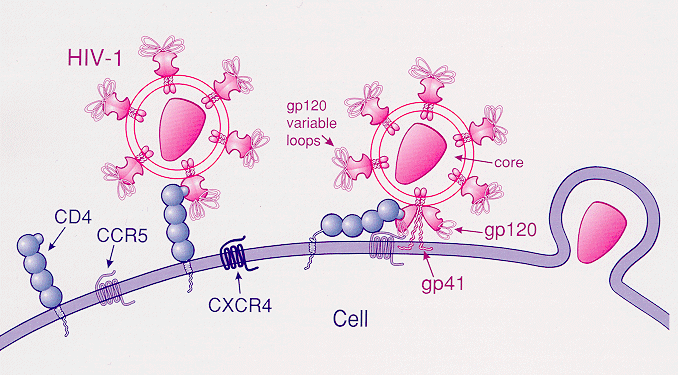
HIV attachment

Many genetic variants may have aided humans in ancient times but plague us today. For example, genes that allow humans to more efficiently process food also make people susceptible to obesity and diabetes today.

== Genome projects and organizations ==
Human genome projects are scientific endeavors that determine or study the structure of the human genome. The Human Genome Project was a landmark genome project.

There are numerous related projects that deal with genetic variation (or variation in the encoded proteins), e.g. organized by the following organizations:

- HUman Genome Organisation (HUGO) -- organizes activities around human genome sequencing, including variants
- Human Genome Variation Society (HGVS) -- develops nomenclatural standards for human genetic variants
- HGVS Variant Nomenclature Committee (HVNC) -- maps and organizes variant nomenclature

== See also ==
- Archaeogenetics
- Chimera (genetics)
- Genealogical DNA test
- Human evolutionary genetics
- Isolation by distance
- Multiregional hypothesis
- Neurodiversity
- Race and genetics
- Recent single origin hypothesis
- Y-chromosome haplogroups in populations of the world

=== Regional ===
- 1000 Genomes Project
- African admixture in Europe
- Genetic history of Europe
- Genetic history of indigenous peoples of the Americas
- Genetic history of South Asia
- Genetic history of the British Isles

=== Projects ===
- Human Variome Project
