= Barbara A. Koenig =

Biomedical ethicist

- Born: Barbara Ann Koenig
- Education: University of California, Berkeley; University of California, San Francisco
- Known for: Ethics of genomics; race and genetics; biobank governance; empirical bioethics
- Notable work: Revisiting Race in a Genomic Age
- Scientific career
- Fields: Bioethics, Medical anthropology
- Workplaces: University of California, San Francisco; Stanford University; Mayo Clinic
- Thesis: The technological imperative in medical practice : an anthropological study of therapeutic plasma exchange (1988)

Barbara Ann Koenig is an American bioethicist and medical anthropologist whose work addresses the ethical, legal, and social implications of genomics, biobanking, and precision medicine. As of 2026, she is professor emerita at the University of California, San Francisco.

== Early life and education ==
Koenig earned a Bachelor of Science in Nursing (1974) and a Bachelor of Arts in Asian History (1976) from the University of Minnesota before completing a Ph.D. in Medical Anthropology in 1988 through a joint program at the University of California, Berkeley and the University of California, San Francisco. Her doctoral dissertation, The Technological Imperative in Medical Practice, examined how medical technologies shape ethical decision-making and clinical care in culturally diverse settings.

== Career ==
After completing her Ph.D., Koenig began her academic career at the University of California, San Francisco (UCSF), where she held early faculty and research appointments during the late 1980s and early 1990s. In 1993, she joined the Stanford University School of Medicine as an associate professor and served as executive director of the Stanford University Center for Biomedical Ethics from 1993 to 2005.

In 2005, Koenig joined the Mayo Clinic in Rochester, Minnesota. She returned to University of California, San Francisco in 2011 as a professor in the Institute for Health & Aging and the Department of Anthropology, History & Social Medicine. In May 2016, she was appointed director of the UCSF Bioethics Program.

She retired from UCSF in June 2020 and as of 2026 she holds the title of professor emerita.

== Research ==
Koenig is known for her work on the intersection of race and genomic science. She co-edited Revisiting Race in a Genomic Age (2008), which examines how advances in genetics reshape understandings of race, ancestry, identity, and health disparities. She also co-organized interdisciplinary workshops that produced the article “Guiding Principles on Using Racial Categories in Human Genetics,” which outlines ethical and scientific considerations for the use of race in genetic research.

Koenig’s scholarship addresses ethical challenges related to biobank governance, informed consent, data sharing, and the return of individual research results. Her work has informed ethical frameworks for large-scale genomic initiatives and population-based screening programs.

== Selected publications ==
- Juengst, Eric T.; Koenig, Barbara A., eds. (1989). The meaning of AIDS: implications for medical science, clinical practice, and public health policy. New York, N.Y.: Praeger. ISBN 978-0-275-92646-5.
- Koenig, B. A., Lee, S. S., & Richardson, S. S. (eds.). Revisiting Race in a Genomic Age. Rutgers University Press, 2008.
- Koenig, B. A. “From Race to Repositories: Bioethics in a Genomics Age.” Human Genetics 126 (2009): 277–282.
- Koenig, B. A. “Have We Asked Too Much of Consent?” Hastings Center Report 44, no. 4 (2014): 33–34.
- Lee, S. S., Mountain, J., & Koenig, B. A. “The Meanings of ‘Race’ in the New Genomics.” Yale Journal of Health Policy, Law, and Ethics 1 (2001): 33–75.

== See also ==
- Bioethics
- Medical anthropology
- Genomics
- Precision medicine
- Biobank
- Race and genetics
