= Limbin =

Protein found in humans

EVC2

Identifiers
- Aliases: EVC2, LBN, WAD, EvC ciliary complex subunit 2
- External IDs: OMIM: 607261; MGI: 1915775; GeneCards: EVC2

Gene location (Human)
Chr.	Chromosome 4 (human)
Band	4p16.2	Start	5,542,772 bp
Band	4p16.2	End	5,709,548 bp

Gene location (Mouse)
Chr.	Chromosome 5 (mouse)
Band	5|5 B3	Start	37,495,843 bp
Band	5|5 B3	End	37,582,399 bp
RNA expression pattern
Bgee	Human / Mouse (ortholog); Top expressed in: pancreatic ductal cell; Achilles tendon; gonad; sural nerve; gastric mucosa; stromal cell of endometrium; ventricular zone; left ovary; right ovary; testicle / Top expressed in: sciatic nerve; hand; otic vesicle; internal carotid artery; proximal tubule; otolith organ; external carotid artery; gastrula; calvaria; utricle; More reference expression data
BioGPS	n/a
Orthologs
Databases	NCBI: entry; OMA: entry
Species	Human	Mouse
Entrez	132884	68525
Ensembl	ENSG00000173040	ENSMUSG00000050248
UniProt	Q86UK5	Q8K1G2
RefSeq (mRNA)	NM_001166136; NM_147127	NM_145920
RefSeq (protein)	NP_001159608; NP_667338	NP_666032
Location (UCSC)	Chr 4: 5.54 – 5.71 Mb	Chr 5: 37.5 – 37.58 Mb
PubMed search
- Wikidata
View/Edit Human	View/Edit Mouse

Limbin (LBN) is a protein that in humans is encoded by the EVC2 gene. Together with EvC, it is part of the EvC complex, the activity of which is critical in bone formation and skeletal development. The complex positively regulates ciliary Hedgehog (Hh) signaling due to the ciliary localization.

A mutation in these genes is associated with The Ellis-van Creveld (EvC) syndrome. EvC or otherwise known as Chondroestodermal dysplasia is a disorder inherited by the offspring of carriers of the mutated recessive gene and a non-mutated dominant gene leading to expression of chondrodysplasia and dwarfism. Bone growth occurs due to continuous proliferation and differentiation of chondrocytes along with endochondral ossification at both ends of a long bone. The mutations in LBN cause premature termination of encoded proteins resulting in shortening of long bones.

Other characteristics accredited to a mutation in LBN include difficulty breathing due to shorted ribs, shortened tongue, dysplastic fingernails, and postaxial polydactyly.
