= Octaman =

1971 film by Harry Essex

- Theatrical release poster
- Directed by: Harry Essex
- Written by: Harry Essex
- Produced by: Michael Kraike
- Starring: Pier Angeli; Kerwin Mathews; Jeff Morrow; David Essex; Read Morgan
- Cinematography: Robert Caramico
- Edited by: Robert Freeman
- Production companies: Filmers Guild; Heritage Enterprises Inc.
- Distributed by: Heritage Enterprises Inc.
- Release date: November 3, 1971 (Mexico)
- Running time: 76 minutes
- Countries: Mexico; United States
- Language: English
- Budget: $250,000

Octaman is a 1971 Mexican-American science-fiction monster film written and directed by Harry Essex, with the costume design by future Academy Award winner Rick Baker. It follows an expedition team that becomes the target of a murderous humanoid octopus. The film received negative reviews. On April 18, 2019, the film was shown theatrically in the United States as part of the RiffTrax Live series.

== Plot ==
A scientific expedition to a remote Mexican fishing community, led by Dr. Rick Torres and Susan Lowry, discovers unhealthy amounts of radiation in the local waters. They find a small mutant octopus that can crawl on land. Torres travels back to the States to present his findings, hoping to be granted more funding. Reception from the scientific establishment is lukewarm, so Torres makes a deal with Johnny Caruso, a circus owner who is interested in the bizarre mutation as a carny act. After their departure, a humanoid octopus, Octaman, attacks the camp and slaughters the remaining crew.

The scientists return to the camp in an RV a few days later and find it abandoned. Davido, a young Indian man from the nearby village, says that a local legend about a creature said to be half man and half sea serpent is true, and offers to take the scientists to the lake where it is purported to live. Meanwhile, Octaman kills some villagers. The next day, the scientists find another small mutant octopus, and Octaman has gone to the camp and killed a crew member and escaped. Johnny, witness to the attack, decides to capture the monster for his circus.

Octaman returns to the RV, but Lowry honks the horn to signal for help. The other scientists arrive and the monster flees. They go searching for it on the lake, and it pulls down another crew member out of their boat. When it reappears at the RV and captures Lowry, they blind it with their flashlights to stop it in its tracks, then light a ring of gasoline around it. The fire consumes enough oxygen that the monster suffocates and falls unconscious, and Lowry is rescued. They finish the capture by tranquilizing it and trapping it under a net. In the morning, however, a thunderstorm brings rain which revives the Octaman and allows it to escape. It moves to seize Lowry, but she communicates with it and sends it away.

Davido tracks Octaman into a cave. The others consider abandoning the pursuit, but Davido goads them on. Octaman chases them into the back of the cave, gaining enough time to block the cave mouth and seal them in. However, Davido finds another way out. They return to the RV, but find Octaman waiting for them inside. In order to spare her colleagues, Lowry allows herself to be captured. Now determined to kill the beast, the remaining expedition members arm themselves and pursue the pair. Lowry shoots the creature at close range with a concealed handgun, allowing her to escape its clutches. The expedition members fire more shots at the creature, which retreats into the lake and sinks below the surface.

== Cast ==
- Pier Angeli as Susan Lowry
- David Essex as Davido
- Kerwin Mathews as Dr. Rick Torres
- Jeff Morrow as Dr. John Willard
- Read Morgan as the Octaman

== Release ==
=== Home media ===
Octaman was released in 1980 on the VHS format by the European Video Corporation. A 40th anniversary widescreen DVD edition was released in 2012 by BayView Entertainment.

== Reception ==
Fred Beldin from AllMovie gave the film a negative review, writing, "Though the silly rubber suit affords the viewer a fair amount of yuks, Octaman is a cheap, sluggish vehicle that gets tiresome long before the monster finally gives up and dies, and bad day-for-night shooting renders many sequences murky and hard to decipher." On his website Fantastic Movie Musings and Ramblings, Dave Sindelar called the film "dull and repetitive", and complained that the film was too dark, making it difficult to see any of the action. Sindelar also criticized the film's lack of pacing, uninteresting characters, and design of the title monster.

Dread Central wrote, "Octaman I recommend strictly for fans of old school monster movies and cult cinema, as well as bad movie aficionados, and even then there’s a part of me that suggests you be prepared to fast forward when things get bogged down with dry, talky dialogue and a needlessly long cave searching scene that only results in the characters ending up pretty much back where they started."

== See also ==
- List of killer octopus films
