= European Video Corporation =

The European Video Corporation, also known as EVC, is a European home video distribution company. They have released various low-budget films on VHS, VCC, and Betamax, ranging in year from 1949 to 1986. Their home media films have been released in the Netherlands and Belgium.

== Films released ==
- Abbott and Costello in Africa Screams (1949)
- Tulsa (1949)
- Hercules in the Haunted World (1961)
- Maciste all'inferno (1962)
- Octaman (1971)
- Tombs of the Blind Dead (1971)
- Tales of Canterbury (1973)
- Die Stoßburg (1974)
- The Alien Factor (1976)
- Cola, Candy, Chocolate (1979)
- The Great Alligator (1979)
- Alien 2: On Earth (1980)
- City of the Living Dead (1980)
- White Cannibal Queen (1980)
- The Final Countdown (1980)
- Scanners (1981)
- Zen Kwan Do Strikes Paris (1981)
- Caged Fury (1983)
- Enigma (1982)
- The blue-eyed Bandit a.k.a. Il Bandito dagli Occhi Azzurri (1982)
- Blood Simple (1984)
- Once Upon a Time in America (1984)
- Yellow Hair and the Fortress of Gold (1984)
- Almost You (1985)
- Sloane (1986)
