= Economic value to the customer =

Pricing methodology

Economic Value to the Customer (EVC) is a value-based pricing methodology developed in 1979 by John L. Forbis and Nitin T. Mehta.

== Economic Value to the Customer (EVC) ==
The method aims to guide businesses on how to best price a product or service. The EVC process enables businesses to capture more value than a traditional cost-plus pricing strategy. Companies can leverage the method to estimate the value a customer derives from purchasing a product or service. The EVC is calculated by adding both tangible and intangible value elements a product or service provides to a customer.

=== How to calculate the EVC ===
1. Determine the different value elements that impact a customer (both positive and negative).
2. Assign a monetary value for each element.
3. Determine the selling price of the next-best-alternative to the product or service offered.
4. The cumulative monetary value for each element is known as the "total additional value." Add the calculated "total additional value" to the next-best-alternative to determine the EVC.
5. Select what portion of the "total additional value" the company will capture. Note: the remaining value will be passed along to the customer.

=== Example ===
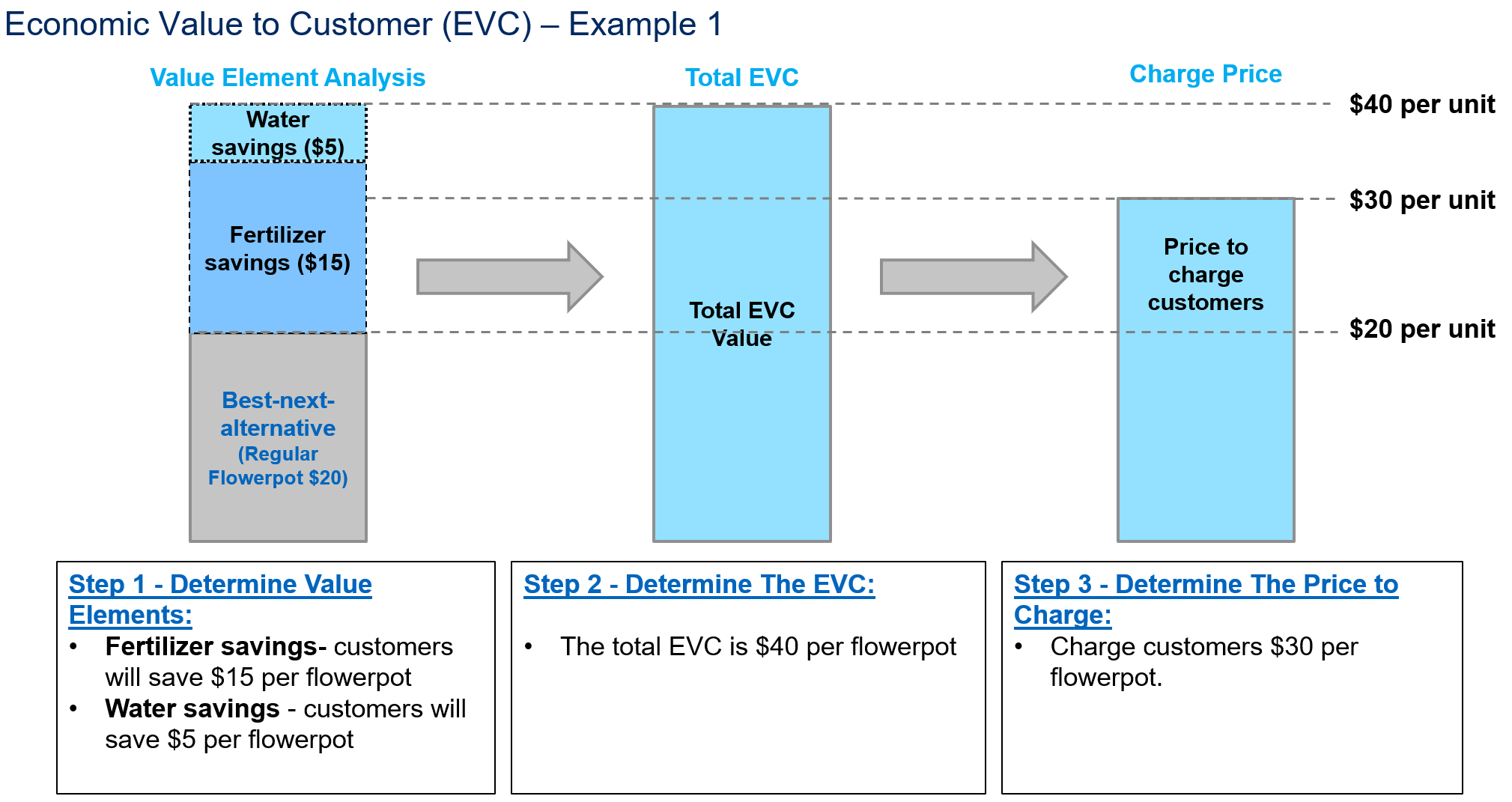
Pricing a new flowerpot with the EVC method.

For example, assume that a company is introducing a flowerpot that requires less water and fertilizer for plants to grow. The traditional flowerpot is the next-best-alternative.

Following are the main steps the company will undertake to determine the EVC:

1. With the new flowerpot there are two value elements provided to the customers: the plants require less fertilizer, and less water.
2. The decreased need for fertilizer saves customers $15 per flowerpot. In addition, customers save $5 per pot due to lower water intake.
3. The next-best-alternative for new flowerpot is a regular pot currently sold for $20/unit.
4. The EVC is the sum of all value elements ($20 = $15 + $5) and the next-best-alternative ($20), which equals $40 per new flowerpot.
5. The company decides to capture 50% of the "total additional value," which is $10 per unit, and thus will charge the customer $30 per new pot.

It is important that the company determines an optimal split of the "total additional value" between itself and its customers. If the company captures the "total additional value" fully, then customers are indifferent between the new and the incumbent product or service. The Economic Value to the Customer is one of the many pricing architectures a business can use as a pricing strategy. It is key for organizations to invest time and resources to determine the optimal price for a product or service to maximize revenues.
