= Ellis–Van Creveld syndrome =

- Other names: Chondroectodermal dysplasia
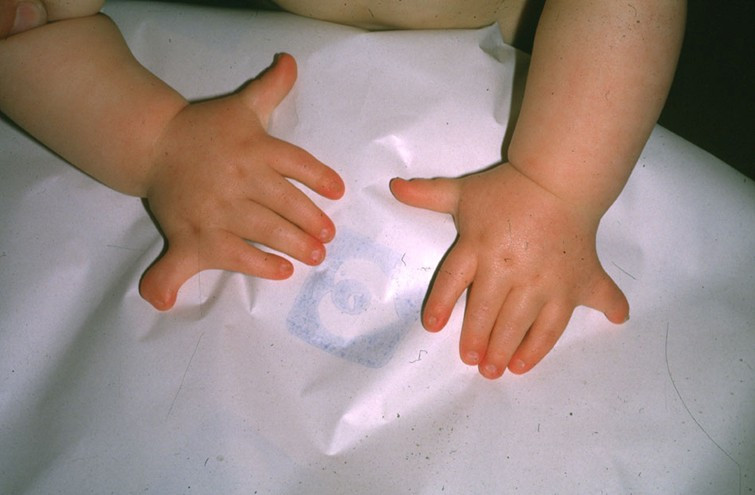
- Polydactyly in Ellis–Van Creveld syndrome
- Specialty: Medical genetics

Ellis–Van Creveld syndrome (also called mesoectodermal dysplasia) is a rare genetic disorder of the skeletal dysplasia type.

== Signs and symptoms ==
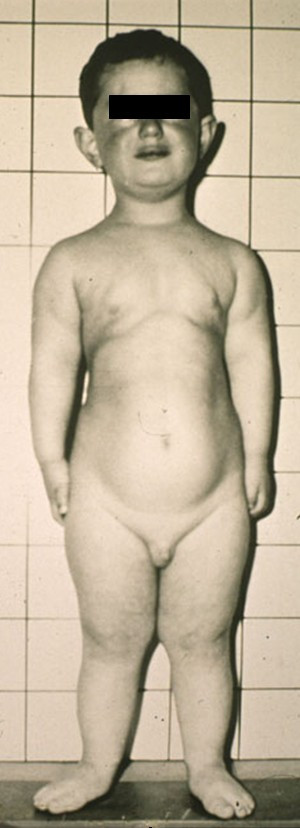
Patient with Ellis–Van Creveld syndrome at the age of 5 years showing long narrow chest and shortness of the limbs

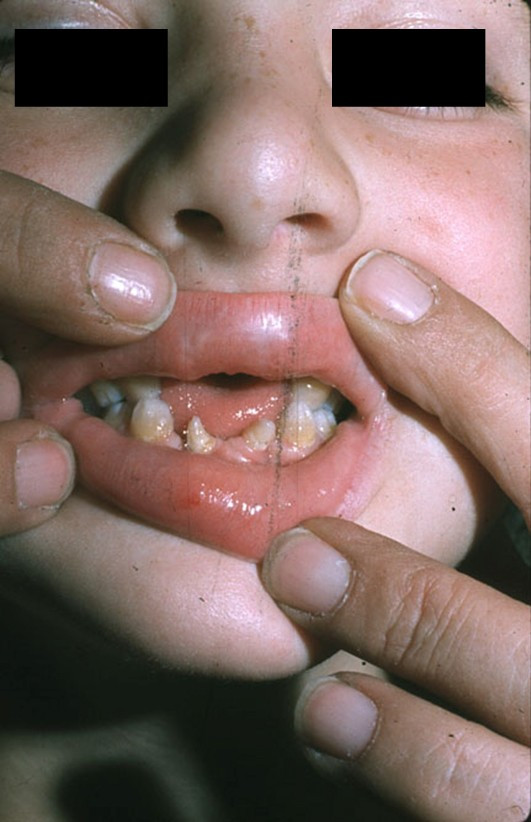
Anterior view of the mouth of EVC patient showing absence of upper incisors and conical lower incisors

It involves numerous anomalies including:

- Post-axial polydactyly
- Congenital heart defects (most commonly an atrial septal defect producing a common atrium, occurring in 60% of affected individuals)
- Teeth present at birth (neonatal teeth)
- Fingernail dysplasia
- Short-limbed dwarfism, mesomelic pattern
- Short ribs
- Cleft palate
- Malformation of the wrist bones (fusion of the hamate and capitate bones).

== Genetics ==
Ellis–Van Creveld syndrome often is the result of founder effects in isolated human populations, such as the Amish and some small island inhabitants. Although relatively rare, this disorder does occur with higher incidence within founder-effect populations due to lack of genetic variability. Observation of the inheritance pattern has illustrated that the disease is autosomal recessive, meaning that both parents have to carry the gene in order for an individual to be affected by the disorder.

Ellis–Van Creveld syndrome is caused by a mutation in the EVC gene, as well as by a mutation in a nonhomologous gene, Limbin, located close to the EVC gene in a head-to-head configuration. The gene was identified by positional cloning. The EVC gene maps to the chromosome 4 short arm (4p16). The function of a healthy EVC gene is not well understood at this time.

=== Relation to other rare disorders ===
Until recently, the medical literature did not indicate a connection among many genetic disorders, both genetic syndromes and genetic diseases, that are now being found to be related. As a result of genetic research, some of these are, in fact, highly related in their root cause despite the widely varying set of medical symptoms that are clinically visible in the disorders. Ellis–Van Creveld syndrome is one such disease, part of an emerging class of diseases called ciliopathies. The underlying cause may be a dysfunctional molecular mechanism in the primary cilia structures of the cell, organelles which are present in many cellular types throughout the human body. The cilia defects adversely affect "numerous critical developmental signaling pathways" essential to cellular development and thus offer a plausible hypothesis for the often multi-symptom nature of a large set of syndromes and diseases. Known ciliopathies include primary ciliary dyskinesia, Bardet–Biedl syndrome, polycystic kidney disease, polycystic liver disease, nephronophthisis, Alström syndrome, Meckel–Gruber syndrome and some forms of retinal degeneration.

Weyers acrofacial dysostosis is due to another mutation in the EVC gene and hence is allelic with Ellis–Van Creveld syndrome.

== Treatment ==
There is no causative or curative therapy. Symptomatic medical treatments are focusing on symptoms caused by orthopedic, dental or cardiac problems. Regarding perioperative / anesthesiological management, recommendations for medical professionals are published at OrphanAnesthesia.

== History ==
The disorder was described by Richard W. B. Ellis (1902–1966) of Edinburgh and Simon van Creveld (1895–1971) of Amsterdam. Each had a patient with this syndrome, as they had discovered when they met in the same train compartment on the way to a pediatrics conference in England in the late 1930s. A third patient had been referred to by L. Emmett Holt Jr. and Rustin McIntosh in a textbook of pediatrics (Holt and McIntosh, 1933) and was included in full in the paper by Ellis and Van Creveld (1940).

McCusick et al. (1964) followed up with a study of its incidence in the Amish population. He observed the largest pedigree so far, in an inbred religious isolate, the Old Order Amish, in Lancaster County, Pennsylvania. Almost as many people were known in that one group as had been reported in all medical literature up to then.

== Nomenclature ==
Six-fingered dwarfism (digital integer deficiency) was an alternative designation used for this condition when it was being studied in the Amish and may have served a useful function in defining this then little known condition for the medical profession, as well as the lay public. The term, however, has been found offensive by some because of the reference to the polydactyly, which is seen as a 'freakish' label. This leaves Ellis–Van Creveld syndrome with its initialism, EVC, as the only acceptable name. Chondroectodermal dysplasia and mesoectodermal dysplasia do not well define the entity and are not satisfactory for general usage, either medical or otherwise.
