= VESA Enhanced Video Connector =

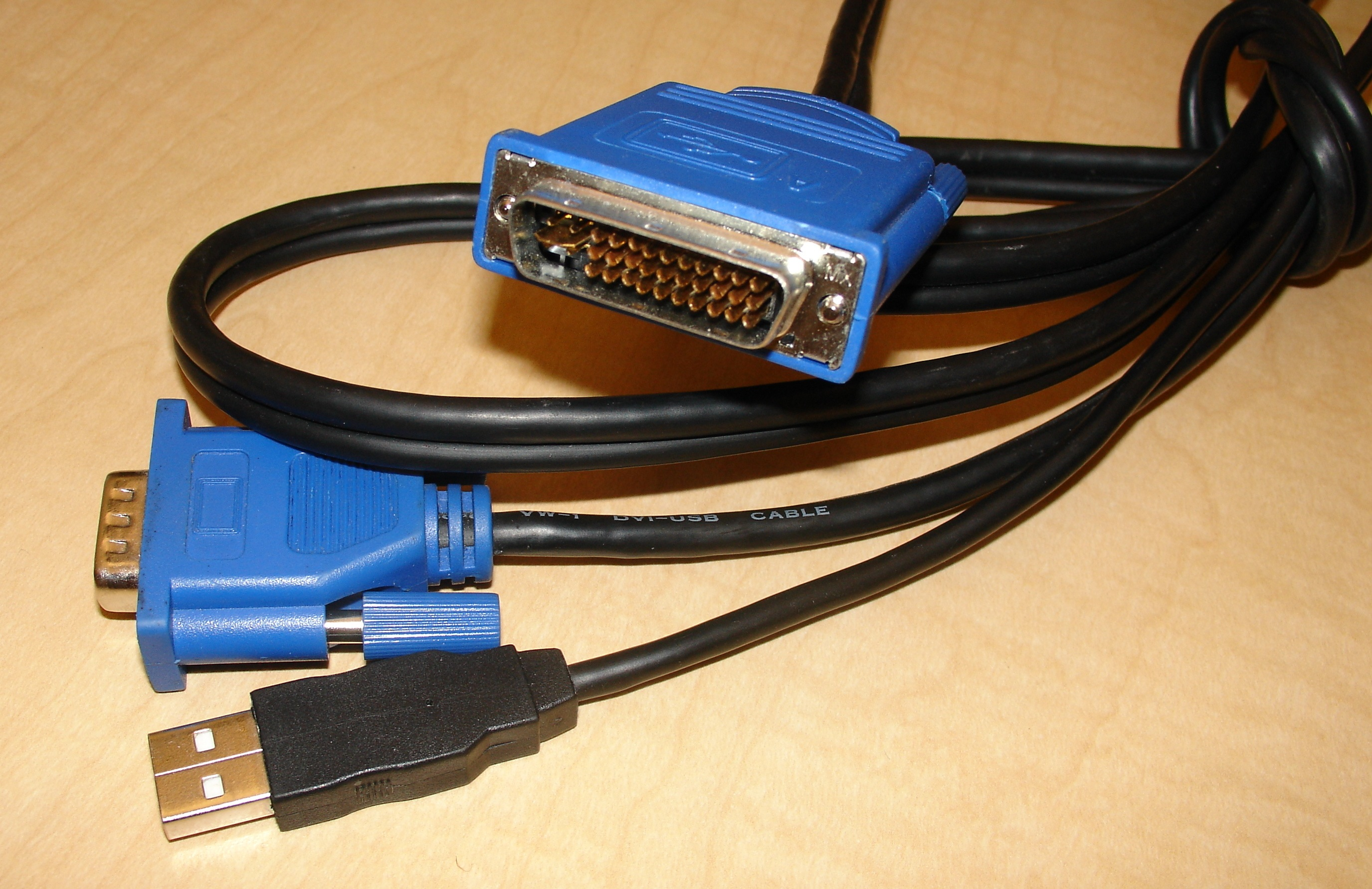
M1-A EVC cable

The VESA Enhanced Video Connector (EVC) is a VESA standard that was intended to reduce the number of cables around a computer by incorporating video, audio, FireWire and USB into a single cable system, terminating in a 35-pin Molex MicroCross connector. The intent was to make the monitor the central point of connection. The EVC physical standard was ratified in November 1994, and the pinout and signaling standard followed one year later.

== History ==
The Video Electronic Standards Association (VESA) began working on a successor to the VGA connector for analog video and released the EVC physical standard in November 1994, followed by a pinout and signal standard in November 1995. After the P&D standard was released in June 1997, revisions to the EVC standards were issued in November 1997.

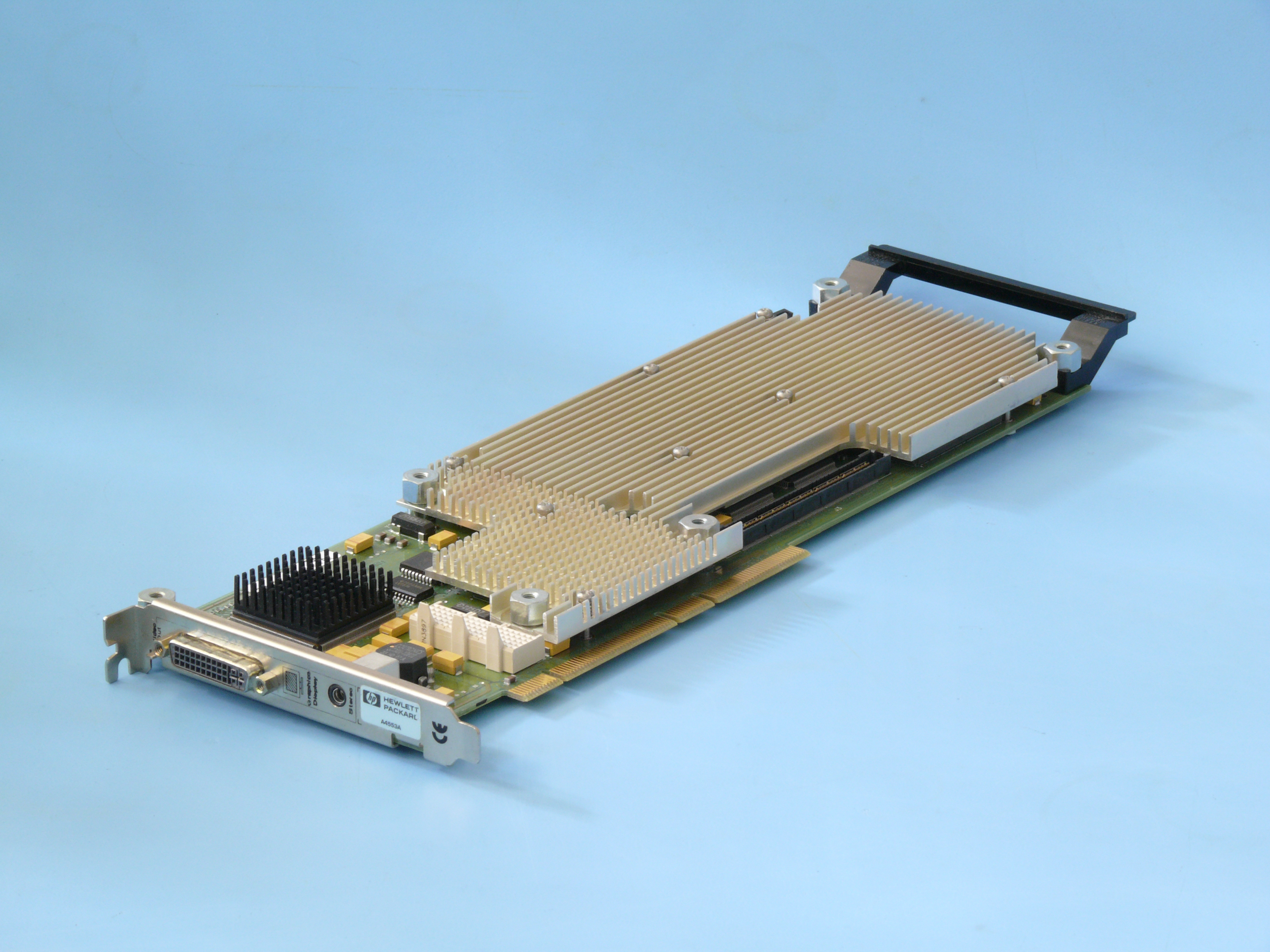
Some HP9000 workstations used the EVC connector, photographed here on a VISUALIZE fx4 graphics card (p/n A4553A)

EVC was used for few products, perhaps most commonly found on the HP9000 B/C/J-class workstations introduced in 1997. Although EVC did not find favour with computer manufacturers, it evolved into the somewhat more popular VESA Plug and Display (P&D) standard using a physically identical 35-pin interface with a different shell, capable of transmitting video (both analog and digital) and data. Digital Visual Interface (DVI, 1999), essentially a modified version of P&D stripped of the data signals with higher maximum resolution by adding a second, three-pair digital video channel, would become the industry standard for digital video connections and achieved widespread implementation.

== Technical ==
A VESA EVC connector is capable of carrying analog video (VGA-based) output, video input (composite or S-video), FireWire, analog stereo audio (input and output), and USB signals. Analog video is carried by the C1–C4 pins surrounding the C5 crossed ground plane; this was a development of the 13W3 connector, which was typically fitted to high-end workstations and had three miniature coaxial terminals embedded in the connector. The quasi-coaxial "MicroCross" developed by Molex provided comparable shielding performance with a simpler assembly. The physical arrangement of the EVC pins is identical to the newer VESA Plug and Display (P&D), which carries digital video over the pins used in EVC to carry analog audio (input and output) and video input. The connectors can be distinguished by the shape of the shell: the shell of the EVC connector is shaped like an isosceles trapezoid, similar to the shell of a D-subminiature connector, while the P&D connector instead has a D-shaped shell, similar to a DVI connector.

The updated EVC standards in 1997 gave it the alternate name P&D-A, linking it to the P&D family of connectors, which had been released earlier that year and specified an analog & digital video connector (P&D-A/D) and a digital-only video connector (P&D-D).

VESA EVC receptacle pinouts
Pin	Function	EVC (P&D-A)
1	General purpose, third make	Audio output (R)
2	General purpose, third make	Audio output (L)
3	General purpose, third make	Audio output return
4	General purpose, third make	Sync return
5	General purpose, third make	Horizontal sync (TTL)
6	General purpose, third make	Vertical sync (TTL)
7	General purpose, third make	Reserved
8	General purpose, fourth make	Reserved
9	General purpose, third make	1394 pair A, data -
10	General purpose, third make	1394 pair A, data +
11	General purpose, third make	Reserved
12	General purpose, third make	Reserved
13	General purpose, third make	Video input, Y or composite
14	General purpose, third make	Video input, return
15	General purpose, third make	Video input, C
16	General purpose, third make	USB data +
17	General purpose, third make	USB data -
18	General purpose, fourth make	USB / 1394 common mode shield
19	General purpose, third make	1394 Vg
20	General purpose, third make	1394 Vp
21	General purpose, third make	Audio input (L)
22	General purpose, third make	Audio input (R)
23	General purpose, third make	Audio input return
24	General purpose, third make	Stereo sync (TTL)
25	General purpose, third make	DDC return
26	General purpose, third make	DDC data (SDA)
27	General purpose, third make	DDC clock (SCL)
28	General purpose, fourth make	+5 VDC
29	General purpose, third make	1394 pair B, Clock +
30	General purpose, third make	1394 pair B, Clock -
C1	Quasi-Coaxial, fourth make	Red Video
C2	Quasi-Coaxial, fourth make	Green Video
C3	Quasi-Coaxial, fourth make	Not used
C4	Quasi-Coaxial, fourth make	Blue Video
C5	Common ground for quasi-coaxial lines, second make	Ground

== See also ==
- HDI-45 connector, a proprietary standard developed contemporaneously by Apple, also intended to consolidate multiple cables
