= EVC (gene) =

Protein-coding gene in the species Homo sapiens

Identifiers
- Aliases: EVC, DWF-1, EVC1, EVCL, EvC ciliary complex subunit 1
- External IDs: OMIM: 604831; MGI: 1890596; HomoloGene: 10949; GeneCards: EVC; OMA:EVC - orthologs

Gene location (Human)
Chr.	Chromosome 4 (human)
Band	4p16.2	Start	5,711,201 bp
Band	4p16.2	End	5,814,305 bp

Gene location (Mouse)
Chr.	Chromosome 5 (mouse)
Band	5|5 B3	Start	37,446,442 bp
Band	5|5 B3	End	37,494,238 bp
RNA expression pattern
Bgee	Human / Mouse (ortholog); Top expressed in: sural nerve; stromal cell of endometrium; gallbladder; left ovary; Descending thoracic aorta; ascending aorta; right ovary; right coronary artery; Achilles tendon; ventricular zone / Top expressed in: right kidney; human kidney; proximal tubule; gastrula; muscle of thigh; otic vesicle; ventricular zone; tunica media of zone of aorta; soleus muscle; internal carotid artery; More reference expression data
BioGPS	n/a
Orthologs
Species	Human	Mouse
Entrez	2121	59056
Ensembl	ENSG00000072840	ENSMUSG00000029122
UniProt	P57679; Q5U3C2	P57680
RefSeq (mRNA)	NM_001306090; NM_001306092; NM_014556; NM_153717	NM_021292
RefSeq (protein)	NP_001293019; NP_001293021; NP_714928; NP_001293021.1	NP_067267
Location (UCSC)	Chr 4: 5.71 – 5.81 Mb	Chr 5: 37.45 – 37.49 Mb
PubMed search
- Wikidata
View/Edit Human	View/Edit Mouse

Ellis van Creveld syndrome
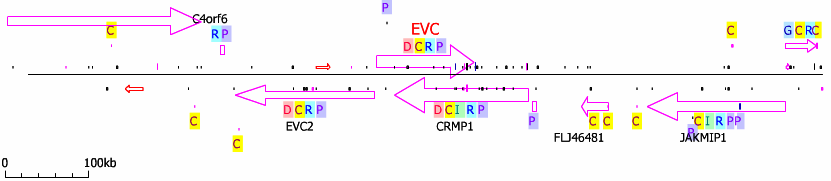
- EVC gene and its neighbors on chromosome 4p16

Identifiers
- Symbol: EVC
- NCBI gene: 2121
- HGNC: 3497
- OMIM: 604831
- RefSeq: NM_153717
- UniProt: P57679

Other data
- Locus: Chr. 4 p16
Search for
- Structures: Swiss-model
- Domains: InterPro

EVC is a gene associated with Ellis–Van Creveld syndrome. It overlaps with the CRMP1 gene.

EVC is one of two genes (the other being EVC2) that upon mutation give rise to EvC (Ellis-van Creveld) syndrome in humans and is found to act as a positive mediator for three hedgehog (Hh) signaling molecules. Mice with an inactivation of the EVC gene (EVC ^{−}/^{−}) were found to exhibit similar physical characteristics as humans, such as shortened limbs and dental impairments. In a study of 65 individuals affected with EvC, mutations in the EVC gene were found in 20 of them, and primarily attributed to a frameshift resulting in a nonsense codon. More mild physical characteristics not completely associated with EvC syndrome, such as those without the expected oral deformities can also be attributed to EVC gene mutations.

== See also ==
- Leucine zipper
