= Isolated human populations =

Human groups with limited or no recent genetic contact with others

Isolated human populations are human groups that have no or very few recent genetic links to other human groups. An example of this are uncontacted peoples and groups that practice strict endogamy.
