= Race and genetics =

Relevance of genotype to race classification

Researchers have investigated the relationship between race and genetics as part of efforts to understand how biology may or may not contribute to human racial categorization. Today, the consensus among scientists is that race is a social construct, and that using it as a proxy for genetic differences among populations is misleading.

Many constructions of race are associated with phenotypical traits and geographic ancestry, and scholars like Carl Linnaeus have proposed scientific models for the organization of race since at least the 18th century. Following the discovery of Mendelian genetics and the mapping of the human genome, questions about the biology of race have often been framed in terms of genetics. A wide range of research methods have been employed to examine patterns of human variation and their relations to ancestry and racial groups, including studies of individual traits, studies of large populations and genetic clusters, and studies of genetic risk factors for disease.

Research into race and genetics has also been criticized as emerging from, or contributing to, scientific racism. Genetic studies of traits and populations have been used to justify social inequalities associated with race, despite the fact that patterns of human variation have been shown to be mostly clinal, with human genetic code being approximately 99.6% – 99.9% identical between individuals and without clear boundaries between groups.

Some researchers have argued that race can act as a proxy for genetic ancestry because individuals of the same racial category may share a common ancestry, but this view has fallen increasingly out of favor among experts. The mainstream view is that it is necessary to distinguish between biology and the social, political, cultural, and economic factors that contribute to conceptions of race.

Phenotype may have a tangential connection to DNA, but it is still only a rough proxy that would omit various other genetic information. Today, in a somewhat similar way that "gender" is differentiated from the more clear "biological sex", scientists state that potentially "race" / phenotype can be differentiated from the more clear "ancestry". However, this system has also still come under scrutiny as it may fall into the same problems – which would be large, vague groupings with little genetic value.

== Overview ==
=== The concept of race ===
The concept of "race" as a classification system of humans based on visible physical characteristics emerged over the last five centuries, influenced by European colonialism. However, there is widespread evidence of what would be described in modern terms as racial consciousness throughout the entirety of recorded history. For example, in Ancient Egypt there were four broad racial divisions of human beings: Egyptians, Asiatics, Libyans, and Nubians. The concept has manifested in different forms based on social conditions of a particular group, often used to justify unequal treatment. Early influential attempts to classify humans into discrete races include 4 races in Carl Linnaeus's Systema Naturae (Homo europaeus, asiaticus, americanus, and afer) and 5 races in Johann Friedrich Blumenbach's On the Natural Variety of Mankind. Notably, over the next centuries, scholars argued for anywhere from 3 to more than 60 race categories. Race concepts have changed within a society over time; for example, in the United States social and legal designations of "White" have been inconsistently applied to Native Americans, Arab Americans, and Asian Americans, among other groups (See main article: Definitions of whiteness in the United States). Race categories also vary worldwide; for example, the same person might be perceived as belonging to a different category in the United States versus Brazil. Because of the arbitrariness inherent in the concept of race, it is difficult to relate it to biology in a straightforward way.

=== Race and human genetic variation ===
There is broad consensus across the biological and social sciences that race is a social construct, not an accurate representation of human genetic variation. As more progress has been made on sequencing the human genome, it has been found that any two humans will share an average of 99.35% of their DNA based on the approximately 3.1 billion haploid base pairs. However, this number should be understood as an average, any two specific individuals can have their genomes differ by more or less than 0.65%. Additionally, this average is an estimate, subject to change as additional sequences are discovered and populations sampled. In 2010, the genome of Craig Venter was found to differ by an estimated 1.59% from a reference genome created by the National Center for Biotechnology Information.

We nonetheless see wide individual variation in phenotype, which arises from both genetic differences and complex gene-environment interactions. The vast majority of this genetic variation occurs within groups; very little genetic variation differentiates between groups. Crucially, the between-group genetic differences that do exist do not map onto socially recognized categories of race. Furthermore, although human populations show some genetic clustering across geographic space, human genetic variation is "clinal", or continuous. This, in addition to the fact that different traits vary on different clines, makes it impossible to draw discrete genetic boundaries around human groups. Finally, insights from ancient DNA are revealing that no human population is "pure" – all populations represent a long history of migration and mixing.

== Sources of human genetic variation ==
Genetic variation arises from mutations, from natural selection, migration between populations (gene flow) and from the reshuffling of genes through sexual reproduction. Mutations lead to a change in the DNA structure, as the order of the bases are rearranged. Resultantly, different polypeptide proteins are coded. Some mutations may be positive and can help the individual survive more effectively in their environment. Mutation is counteracted by natural selection and by genetic drift; note too the founder effect, when a small number of initial founders establish a population which hence starts with a correspondingly small degree of genetic variation. Epigenetic inheritance involves heritable changes in phenotype (appearance) or gene expression caused by mechanisms other than changes in the DNA sequence.

Human phenotypes are highly polygenic (dependent on interaction by many genes) and are influenced by environment as well as by genetics.

Nucleotide diversity is based on single mutations, single nucleotide polymorphisms (SNPs). The nucleotide diversity between humans is about 0.1 percent (one difference per one thousand nucleotides between two humans chosen at random). This amounts to approximately three million SNPs (since the human genome has about three billion nucleotides). There are an estimated ten million SNPs in the human population.

Research has shown that non-SNP (structural) variation accounts for more human genetic variation than single nucleotide diversity. Structural variation includes copy-number variation and results from deletions, inversions, insertions and duplications. It is estimated that approximately 0.4 to 0.6 percent of the genomes of unrelated people differ.

== Genetic basis for race ==
Much scientific research has been organized around the question of whether or not there is genetic basis for race. In Luigi Luca Cavalli-Sforza's book (circa 1994) "The History and Geography of Human Genes" he writes, "From a scientific point of view, the concept of race has failed to obtain any consensus; none is likely, given the gradual variation in existence. It may be objected that the racial stereotypes have a consistency that allows even the layman to classify individuals. However, the major stereotypes, all based on skin color, hair color and form, and facial traits, reflect superficial differences that are not confirmed by deeper analysis with more reliable genetic traits and whose origin dates from recent evolution mostly under the effect of climate and perhaps sexual selection".

A 2015 review article concludes that with advances in detecting and dating admixture (mixing of groups), there is more evidence that admixture between populations has occurred throughout human history. Genetic differences between races are generally correlated to geographic distance.

In 2018 geneticist David Reich reaffirmed the conclusion that the traditional views which assert a biological basis for race are wrong:

Today, many people assume that humans can be grouped biologically into "primeval" groups, corresponding to our notion of "races"... But this long-held view about "race" has just in the last years been proven wrong.

— David Reich, Who We Are and How We Got Here, (Introduction, pg. xxiv).

In 1956, some scientists proposed that race may be similar to dog breeds within dogs. However, this theory has since been discarded, with one of the main reasons being that purebred dogs have been specifically bred artificially, whereas human races developed organically. Furthermore, the genetic variation between purebred dog breeds is far greater than that of human populations. Dog-breed intervariation is roughly 27.5%, whereas human population intervariation is only estimated to be between 5.4% and 15.6%.

== Research methods ==
Scientists investigating human variation have used a series of methods to characterize how different populations vary.

=== Early studies of traits, proteins, and genes ===
Early racial classification attempts measured surface traits, particularly skin color, hair color and texture, eye color, and head size and shape. (Measurements of the latter through craniometry were repeatedly discredited in the late 19th and mid-20th centuries due to a lack of correlation of phenotypic traits with racial categorization.) In actuality, biological adaptation plays the biggest role in these bodily features and skin type. A relative handful of genes accounts for the inherited factors shaping a person's appearance. Humans have an estimated 19,000–20,000 human protein-coding genes. Richard Sturm and David Duffy describe 11 genes that affect skin pigmentation and explain most variations in human skin color, the most significant of which are MC1R, ASIP, OCA2, and TYR. There is evidence that as many as 16 different genes could be responsible for eye color in humans; however, the main two genes associated with eye color variation are OCA2 and HERC2, and both are localized in chromosome 15.

==== Analysis of blood proteins and between-group genetics ====
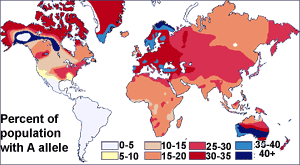
Geographic distribution of blood group A

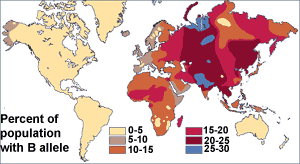
Geographic distribution of blood group B

Before the discovery of DNA, scientists used blood proteins (the human blood group systems) to study human genetic variation. Research by Ludwik and Hanka Herschfeld during World War I found that the incidence of blood groups A and B differed by region; for example, among Europeans 15 percent were group B and 40 percent group A. Eastern Europeans and Russians had a higher incidence of group B; people from India had the greatest incidence. The Herschfelds concluded that humans comprised two "biochemical races", originating separately. It was hypothesized that these two races later mixed, resulting in the patterns of groups A and B. This was one of the first theories of racial differences to include the idea that human variation did not correlate with genetic variation. It was expected that groups with similar proportions of blood groups would be more closely related, but instead it was often found that groups separated by great distances (such as those from Madagascar and Russia), had similar incidences. It was later discovered that the ABO blood group system is not just common to humans, but shared with other primates, and likely predates all human groups.

In 1972, Richard Lewontin performed a F_{ST} statistical analysis using 17 markers (including blood-group proteins). He found that the majority of genetic differences between humans (85.4 percent) were found within a population, 8.3 percent were found between populations within a race and 6.3 percent were found to differentiate races (Caucasian, African, Mongoloid, South Asian Aborigines, Amerinds, Oceanians, and Australian Aborigines in his study). Since then, other analyses have found F_{ST} values of 6–10 percent between continental human groups, 5–15 percent between different populations on the same continent and 75–85 percent within populations. This view has been affirmed by the American Anthropological Association and the American Association of Physical Anthropologists since.

==== Critiques of blood protein analysis ====
While acknowledging Lewontin's observation that humans are genetically homogeneous, A. W. F. Edwards in his 2003 paper "Human Genetic Diversity: Lewontin's Fallacy" argued that information distinguishing populations from each other is hidden in the correlation structure of allele frequencies, making it possible to classify individuals using mathematical techniques. Edwards argued that even if the probability of misclassifying an individual based on a single genetic marker is as high as 30 percent (as Lewontin reported in 1972), the misclassification probability nears zero if enough genetic markers are studied simultaneously. Edwards saw Lewontin's argument as based on a political stance, denying biological differences to argue for social equality. Edwards' paper is reprinted, commented upon by experts such as Noah Rosenberg, and given further context in an interview with philosopher of science Rasmus Grønfeldt Winther in a recent anthology.

As referred to before, Edwards criticises Lewontin's paper as he took 17 different traits and analysed them independently, without looking at them in conjunction with any other protein. Thus, it would have been fairly convenient for Lewontin to come up with the conclusion that racial naturalism is not tenable, according to his argument. Sesardic also strengthened Edwards' view, as he used an illustration referring to squares and triangles, and showed that if you look at one trait in isolation, then it will most likely be a bad predicator of which group the individual belongs to. In contrast, in a 2014 paper, reprinted in the 2018 Edwards Cambridge University Press volume, Rasmus Grønfeldt Winther argues that "Lewontin's Fallacy" is effectively a misnomer, as there really are two different sets of methods and questions at play in studying the genomic population structure of our species: "variance partitioning" and "clustering analysis." According to Winther, they are "two sides of the same mathematics coin" and neither "necessarily implies anything about the reality of human groups."

=== Current studies of population genetics ===
Researchers currently use genetic testing, which may involve hundreds (or thousands) of genetic markers or the entire genome.

==== Structure ====
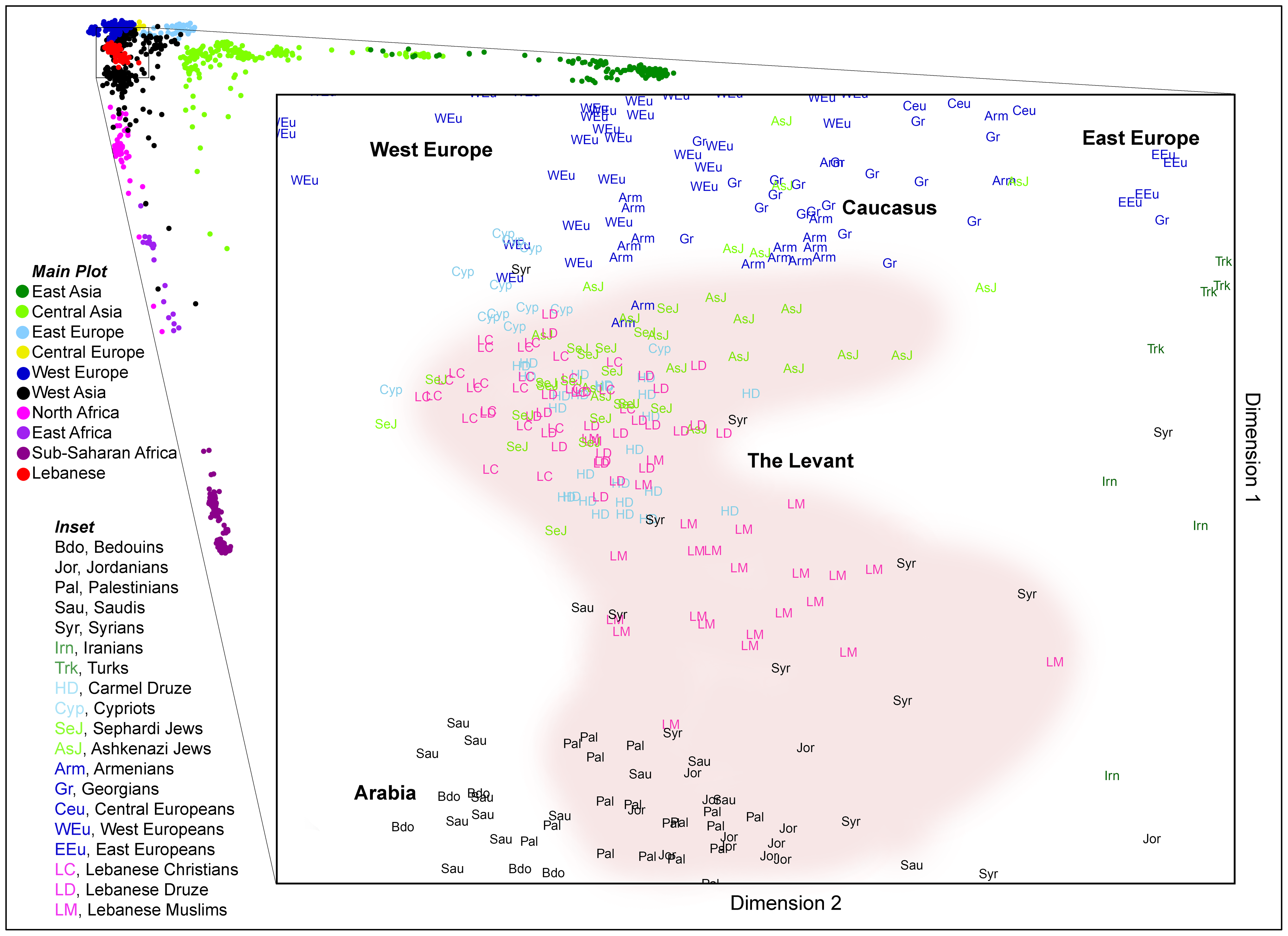
Principal component analysis of fifty populations, color-coded by region, illustrates the differentiation and overlap of populations found using this method of analysis.

Individuals mostly have genetic variants which are found in multiple regions of the world. Based on data from "A unified genealogy of modern and ancient genomes".

Several methods to examine and quantify genetic subgroups exist, including cluster and principal components analysis. Genetic markers from individuals are examined to find a population's genetic structure. While subgroups overlap when examining variants of one marker only, when a number of markers are examined different subgroups have different average genetic structure. An individual may be described as belonging to several subgroups. These subgroups may be more or less distinct, depending on how much overlap there is with other subgroups.

In cluster analysis, the number of clusters to search for K is determined in advance; how distinct the clusters are varies.

The results obtained from cluster analyses depend on several factors:

- A large number of genetic markers studied facilitates finding distinct clusters.
- Some genetic markers vary more than others, so fewer are required to find distinct clusters. Ancestry-informative markers exhibit substantially different frequencies between populations from different geographical regions. Using AIMs, scientists can determine a person's ancestral continent of origin based solely on their DNA. AIMs can also be used to determine someone's admixture proportions.
- The more individuals studied, the easier it becomes to detect distinct clusters (statistical noise is reduced).
- Low genetic variation makes it more difficult to find distinct clusters. Greater geographic distance generally increases genetic variation, making identifying clusters easier.
- A similar cluster structure is seen with different genetic markers when the number of genetic markers included is sufficiently large. The clustering structure obtained with different statistical techniques is similar. A similar cluster structure is found in the original sample with a subsample of the original sample.

Recent studies have been published using an increasing number of genetic markers.

Focus on study of structure has been criticized for giving the general public a misleading impression of human genetic variation, obscuring the general finding that genetic variants which are limited to one region tend to be rare within that region, variants that are common within a region tend to be shared across the globe, and most differences between individuals, whether they come from the same region or different regions, are due to global variants.

==== Distance ====
Genetic distance is genetic divergence between species or populations of a species. It may compare the genetic similarity of related species, such as humans and chimpanzees. Within a species, genetic distance measures divergence between subgroups. Genetic distance significantly correlates to geographic distance between populations, a phenomenon sometimes known as "isolation by distance". Genetic distance may be the result of physical boundaries restricting gene flow such as islands, deserts, mountains or forests. Genetic distance is measured by the fixation index (F_{ST}). F_{ST} is the correlation of randomly chosen alleles in a subgroup to a larger population. It is often expressed as a proportion of genetic diversity. This comparison of genetic variability within (and between) populations is used in population genetics. The values range from 0 to 1; zero indicates the two populations are freely interbreeding, and one would indicate that two populations are separate.

Many studies place the average F_{ST} distance between human races at about 0.125. Henry Harpending argued that this value implies on a world scale a "kinship between two individuals of the same human population is equivalent to kinship between grandparent and grandchild or between half siblings". In fact, the formulas derived in Harpending's paper in the "Kinship in a subdivided population" section imply that two unrelated individuals of the same race have a higher coefficient of kinship (0.125) than an individual and their mixed race half-sibling (0.109).

==== Critiques of F_{ST} ====
While acknowledging that F_{ST} remains useful, a number of scientists have written about other approaches to characterizing human genetic variation. Long & Kittles (2009) stated that F_{ST} failed to identify important variation and that when the analysis includes only humans, F_{ST} = 0.119, but adding chimpanzees increases it only to F_{ST} = 0.183. Mountain & Risch (2004) argued that an F_{ST} estimate of 0.10–0.15 does not rule out a genetic basis for phenotypic differences between groups and that a low F_{ST} estimate implies little about the degree to which genes contribute to between-group differences. Pearse & Crandall 2004 wrote that F_{ST} figures cannot distinguish between a situation of high migration between populations with a long divergence time, and one of a relatively recent shared history but no ongoing gene flow. In their 2015 article, Keith Hunley, Graciela Cabana, and Jeffrey Long (who had previously criticized Lewontin's statistical methodology with Rick Kittles) recalculate the apportionment of human diversity using a more complex model than Lewontin and his successors. They conclude: "In sum, we concur with Lewontin's conclusion that Western-based racial classifications have no taxonomic significance, and we hope that this research, which takes into account our current understanding of the structure of human diversity, places his seminal finding on firmer evolutionary footing."

Anthropologists (such as C. Loring Brace), philosopher Jonathan Kaplan and geneticist Joseph Graves have argued that while it is possible to find biological and genetic variation roughly corresponding to race, this is true for almost all geographically distinct populations: the cluster structure of genetic data is dependent on the initial hypotheses of the researcher and the populations sampled. When one samples continental groups, the clusters become continental; with other sampling patterns, the clusters would be different. Weiss and Fullerton note that if one sampled only Icelanders, Mayans and Maoris, three distinct clusters would form; all other populations would be composed of genetic admixtures of Maori, Icelandic and Mayan material. Kaplan therefore concludes that, while differences in particular allele frequencies can be used to identify populations that loosely correspond to the racial categories common in Western social discourse, the differences are of no more biological significance than the differences found between any human populations (e.g., the Spanish and Portuguese).

=== Historical and geographical analyses ===
Current-population genetic structure does not imply that differing clusters or components indicate only one ancestral home per group; for example, a genetic cluster in the US comprises Hispanics with European, Native American and African ancestry.

Geographic analyses attempt to identify places of origin, their relative importance and possible causes of genetic variation in an area. The results can be presented as maps showing genetic variation. Cavalli-Sforza and colleagues argue that if genetic variations are investigated, they often correspond to population migrations due to new sources of food, improved transportation or shifts in political power. For example, in Europe the most significant direction of genetic variation corresponds to the spread of agriculture from the Middle East to Europe between 10,000 and 6,000 years ago. Such geographic analysis works best in the absence of recent large-scale, rapid migrations.

Historic analyses use differences in genetic variation (measured by genetic distance) as a molecular clock indicating the evolutionary relation of species or groups, and can be used to create evolutionary trees reconstructing population separations.

Results of genetic-ancestry research are supported if they agree with research results from other fields, such as linguistics or archeology. Cavalli-Sforza and colleagues have argued that there is a correspondence between language families found in linguistic research and the population tree they found in their 1994 study. There are generally shorter genetic distances between populations using languages from the same language family. Exceptions to this rule are also found, for example Sami, who are genetically associated with populations speaking languages from other language families. The Sami speak a Uralic language, but are genetically primarily European. This is argued to have resulted from migration (and interbreeding) with Europeans while retaining their original language. Agreement also exists between research dates in archeology and those calculated using genetic distance.

=== Self-identification studies ===
Jorde and Wooding found that while clusters from genetic markers were correlated with some traditional concepts of race, the correlations were imperfect and imprecise due to the continuous and overlapping nature of genetic variation, noting that ancestry, which can be accurately determined, is not equivalent to the concept of race.

A 2005 study by Tang and colleagues used 326 genetic markers to determine genetic clusters. The 3,636 subjects, from the United States and Taiwan, self-identified as belonging to white, African American, East Asian or Hispanic ethnic groups. The study found "nearly perfect correspondence between genetic cluster and SIRE for major ethnic groups living in the United States, with a discrepancy rate of only 0.14 percent". Paschou et al. found "essentially perfect" agreement between 51 self-identified populations of origin and the population's genetic structure, using 650,000 genetic markers. Selecting for informative genetic markers allowed a reduction to less than 650, while retaining near-total accuracy.

Correspondence between genetic clusters in a population (such as the current US population) and self-identified race or ethnic groups does not mean that such a cluster (or group) corresponds to only one ethnic group. African Americans have an estimated 20–25-percent European genetic admixture; Hispanics have European, Native American and African ancestry. In Brazil there has been extensive admixture between Europeans, Amerindians and Africans. As a result, skin color differences within the population are not gradual, and there are relatively weak associations between self-reported race and African ancestry. Ethnoracial self- classification in Brazilians is certainly not random with respect to genome individual ancestry, but the strength of the association between the phenotype and median proportion of African ancestry varies largely across population.

=== Critique of genetic-distance studies and clusters ===
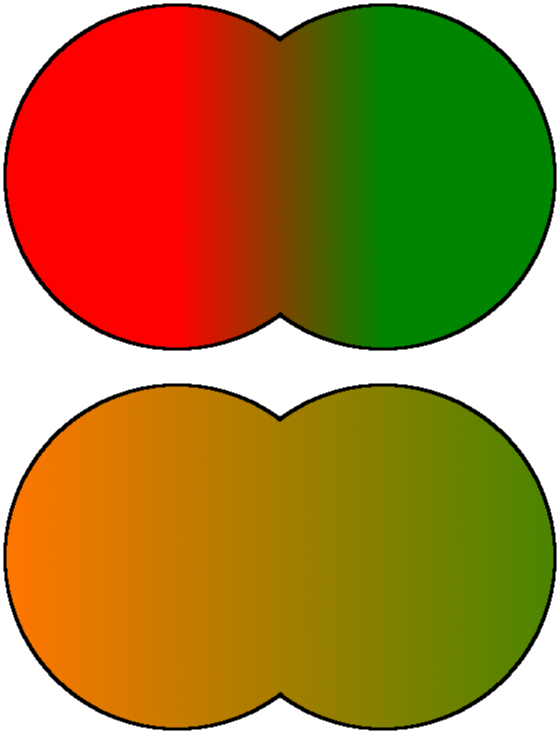
A change in a gene pool may be abrupt or clinal.

Genetic distances generally increase continually with geographic distance, which makes a dividing line arbitrary. Any two neighboring settlements will exhibit some genetic difference from each other, which could be defined as a race. Therefore, attempts to classify races impose an artificial discontinuity on a naturally occurring phenomenon. This explains why studies on population genetic structure yield varying results, depending on methodology.

Rosenberg and colleagues (2005) have argued, based on cluster analysis of the 52 populations in the Human Genetic Diversity Panel, that populations do not always vary continuously and a population's genetic structure is consistent if enough genetic markers (and subjects) are included.

Examination of the relationship between genetic and geographic distance supports a view in which the clusters arise not as an artifact of the sampling scheme, but from small discontinuous jumps in genetic distance for most population pairs on opposite sides of geographic barriers, in comparison with genetic distance for pairs on the same side. Thus, analysis of the 993-locus dataset corroborates our earlier results: if enough markers are used with a sufficiently large worldwide sample, individuals can be partitioned into genetic clusters that match major geographic subdivisions of the globe, with some individuals from intermediate geographic locations having mixed membership in the clusters that correspond to neighboring regions.

They also wrote, regarding a model with five clusters corresponding to Africa, Eurasia (Europe, Middle East, and Central/South Asia), East Asia, Oceania, and the Americas:

For population pairs from the same cluster, as geographic distance increases, genetic distance increases in a linear manner, consistent with a clinal population structure. However, for pairs from different clusters, genetic distance is generally larger than that between intracluster pairs that have the same geographic distance. For example, genetic distances for population pairs with one population in Eurasia and the other in East Asia are greater than those for pairs at equivalent geographic distance within Eurasia or within East Asia. Loosely speaking, it is these small discontinuous jumps in genetic distance—across oceans, the Himalayas, and the Sahara—that provide the basis for the ability of STRUCTURE to identify clusters that correspond to geographic regions.

This applies to populations in their ancestral homes when migrations and gene flow were slow; large, rapid migrations exhibit different characteristics. Tang and colleagues (2004) wrote, "we detected only modest genetic differentiation between different current geographic locales within each race/ethnicity group. Thus, ancient geographic ancestry, which is highly correlated with self-identified race/ethnicity—as opposed to current residence—is the major determinant of genetic structure in the U.S. population".

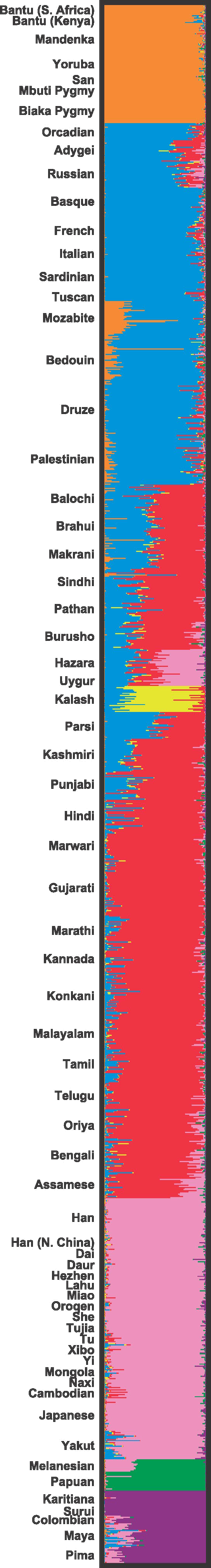
Gene clusters from Rosenberg (2006) for K=7 clusters. (Cluster analysis divides a dataset into any prespecified number of clusters.) Individuals have genes from multiple clusters. The cluster prevalent only among the Kalash people (yellow) only splits off at K=7 and greater.

Cluster analysis has been criticized because the number of clusters to search for is decided in advance, with different values possible (although with varying degrees of probability). Principal component analysis does not decide in advance how many components for which to search.

The 2002 study by Rosenberg et al. exemplifies why meanings of these clusterings can be disputable, though the study shows that at the K=5 cluster analysis, genetic clusterings roughly map onto each of the five major geographical regions. Similar results were gathered in further studies in 2005.

=== Critique of ancestry-informative markers ===
Ancestry-informative markers (AIMs) are a genealogy tracing technology that has come under much criticism due to its reliance on reference populations. In a 2015 article, Troy Duster outlines how contemporary technology allows the tracing of ancestral lineage but along only the lines of one maternal and one paternal line. That is, of 64 total great-great-great-great-grandparents, only one from each parent is identified, implying the other 62 ancestors are ignored in tracing efforts. Furthermore, the 'reference populations' used as markers for membership of a particular group are designated arbitrarily and contemporarily. In other words, using populations who currently reside in given places as references for certain races and ethnic groups is unreliable due to the demographic changes which have occurred over many centuries in those places. Furthermore, ancestry-informative markers being widely shared among the whole human population, it is their frequency which is tested, not their mere absence/presence. A threshold of relative frequency has, therefore, to be set. According to Duster, the criteria for setting such thresholds are a trade secret of the companies marketing the tests. Thus, we cannot say anything conclusive on whether they are appropriate. Results of AIMs are extremely sensitive to where this bar is set. Given that many genetic traits are found to be very similar amid many different populations, the designated threshold frequencies are very important. This can also lead to mistakes, given that many populations may share the same patterns, if not exactly the same genes. "This means that someone from Bulgaria whose ancestors go back to the fifteenth century could (and sometime does) map as partly 'Native American'". This happens because AIMs rely on a '100% purity' assumption of reference populations. That is, they assume that a pattern of traits would ideally be a necessary and sufficient condition for assigning an individual to an ancestral reference populations.

== Race, genetics, and medicine ==
There are certain statistical differences between racial groups in susceptibility to certain diseases. Genes change in response to local diseases; for example, people who are Duffy-negative tend to have a higher resistance to malaria. The Duffy negative phenotype is highly frequent in central Africa and the frequency decreases with distance away from Central Africa, with higher frequencies in global populations with high degrees of recent African immigration. This suggests that the Duffy negative genotype evolved in Sub-Saharan Africa and was subsequently positively selected for in the Malaria endemic zone. A number of genetic conditions prevalent in malaria-endemic areas may provide genetic resistance to malaria, including sickle cell disease, thalassaemias and glucose-6-phosphate dehydrogenase. Cystic fibrosis is the most common life-limiting autosomal recessive disease among people of European ancestry; a hypothesized heterozygote advantage, providing resistance to diseases earlier common in Europe, has been challenged. Scientists Michael Yudell, Dorothy Roberts, Rob DeSalle, and Sarah Tishkoff argue that using these associations in the practice of medicine has led doctors to overlook or misidentify disease: "For example, hemoglobinopathies can be misdiagnosed because of the identification of sickle-cell as a 'Black' disease and thalassemia as a 'Mediterranean' disease. Cystic fibrosis is underdiagnosed in populations of African ancestry, because it is thought of as a 'White' disease."

Information about a person's population of origin may aid in diagnosis, and adverse drug responses may vary by group. Because of the correlation between self-identified race and genetic clusters, medical treatments influenced by genetics have varying rates of success between self-defined racial groups. For this reason, some physicians consider a patient's race in choosing the most effective treatment, and some drugs are marketed with race-specific instructions. Jorde and Wooding (2004) have argued that because of genetic variation within racial groups, when "it finally becomes feasible and available, individual genetic assessment of relevant genes will probably prove more useful than race in medical decision making". However, race continues to be a factor when examining groups (such as epidemiologic research). Some doctors and scientists such as geneticist Neil Risch argue that using self-identified race as a proxy for ancestry is necessary to be able to get a sufficiently broad sample of different ancestral populations, and in turn to be able to provide health care that is tailored to the needs of minority groups.

=== Usage in scientific journals ===
Some scientific journals have addressed previous methodological errors by requiring more rigorous scrutiny of population variables. Since 2000, Nature Genetics requires its authors to "explain why they make use of particular ethnic groups or populations, and how classification was achieved". Editors of Nature Genetics say that "[they] hope that this will raise awareness and inspire more rigorous designs of genetic and epidemiological studies".

A 2021 study that examined over 11,000 papers from 1949 to 2018 in The American Journal of Human Genetics, found that "race" was used in only 5% of papers published in the last decade, down from 22% in the first. Together with an increase in use of the terms "ethnicity," "ancestry," and location-based terms, it suggests that human geneticists have mostly abandoned the term "race."

In March 2024, editors across several biomedical and genetics journals issued joint guidance advising that self-identified race and ethnicity should not be used as proxies for genetic ancestry groups and that any population descriptors should be justified in the Methods section.

=== Gene-environment interactions ===
Lorusso and Bacchini argue that self-identified race is of greater use in medicine as it correlates strongly with risk-related exposomes that are potentially heritable when they become embodied in the epigenome. They summarise evidence of the link between racial discrimination and health outcomes due to poorer food quality, access to healthcare, housing conditions, education, access to information, exposure to infectious agents and toxic substances, and material scarcity. They also cite evidence that this process can work positively – for example, the psychological advantage of perceiving oneself at the top of a social hierarchy is linked to improved health. However they caution that the effects of discrimination do not offer a complete explanation for differential rates of disease and risk factors between racial groups, and the employment of self-identified race has the potential to reinforce racial inequalities.

=== Criticism of race-based medicine ===
Troy Duster points out that genetics is often not the predominant determinant of disease susceptibilities, even though they might correlate with specific socially defined categories. This is because this research oftentimes lacks control for a multiplicity of socio-economic factors. He cites data collected by King and Rewers that indicates how dietary differences play a significant role in explaining variations of diabetes prevalence between populations.

Duster elaborates by putting forward the example of the Pima of Arizona, a population suffering from disproportionately high rates of diabetes. The reason for such, he argues, was not necessarily a result of the prevalence of the FABP2 gene, which is associated with insulin resistance. Rather he argues that scientists often discount the lifestyle implications under specific socio-historical contexts. For instance, near the end of the 19th century, the Pima economy was predominantly agriculture-based. However, as the European American population settles into traditionally Pima territory, the Pima lifestyles became heavily Westernised. Within three decades, the incidence of diabetes increased multiple folds. Governmental provision of free relatively high-fat food to alleviate the prevalence of poverty in the population is noted as an explanation of this phenomenon.

Lorusso and Bacchini argue against the assumption that "self-identified race is a good proxy for a specific genetic ancestry" on the basis that self-identified race is complex: it depends on a range of psychological, cultural and social factors, and is therefore "not a robust proxy for genetic ancestry". Furthermore, they explain that an individual's self-identified race is made up of further, collectively arbitrary factors: personal opinions about what race is and the extent to which it should be taken into consideration in everyday life. Furthermore, individuals who share a genetic ancestry may differ in their racial self-identification across historical or socioeconomic contexts. From this, Lorusso and Bacchini conclude that the accuracy in the prediction of genetic ancestry on the basis of self-identification is low, specifically in racially admixed populations born out of complex ancestral histories.

== Philosophical objections to racial naturalism ==
Racial naturalism is the view that racial classifications are grounded in objective patterns of genetic similarities and differences. Once broadly accepted, this view is now rejected by mainstream science. In addition to the scientific arguments discussed above, philosophers have put forward four main objections to it.

Semantic objections, such as the discreteness objection, argue that the human populations picked out in population-genetic research are not races and do not correspond to what "race" means in the United States. "The discreteness objection does not require there to be no genetic admixture in the human species in order for there to be US 'racial groups' ... rather ... what the objection claims is that membership in US racial groups is different from membership in continental populations. ... Thus, strictly speaking, Blacks are not identical to Africans, Whites are not identical to Eurasians, Asians are not identical to East Asians and so forth." Therefore, it could be argued that scientific research is not really about race.

The next two objections, are metaphysical objections which argue that even if the semantic objections fail, human genetic clustering results do not support the biological reality of race. The 'very important objection' stipulates that races in the US definition fail to be important to biology, in the sense that continental populations do not form biological subspecies. The 'objectively real objection' states that "US racial groups are not biologically real because they are not objectively real in the sense of existing independently of human interest, belief, or some other mental state of humans." Racial naturalists, such as Quayshawn Spencer, have responded to each of these objections with counter-arguments. There are also methodological critics who reject racial naturalism because of concerns relating to the experimental design, execution, or interpretation of the relevant population-genetic research.

Another semantic objection is the visibility objection which refutes the claim that there are US racial groups in human population structures. Philosophers such as Joshua Glasgow and Naomi Zack believe that US racial groups cannot be defined by visible traits, such as skin colour and physical attributes: "The ancestral genetic tracking material has no effect on phenotypes, or biological traits of organisms, which would include the traits deemed racial, because the ancestral tracking genetic material plays no role in the production of proteins it is not the kind of material that 'codes' for protein production." Spencer contends that certain racial discourses require visible groups, but disagrees that this is a requirement in all US racial discourse.

A different objection states that US racial groups are not biologically real because they are not objectively real in the sense of existing independently of some mental state of humans. Proponents of this second metaphysical objection include Naomi Zack and Ron Sundstrom. Spencer argues that an entity can be both biologically real and socially constructed. Spencer states that in order to accurately capture real biological entities, social factors must also be considered.

It has been argued that knowledge of a person's race is limited in value, since people of the same race vary from one another. David J. Witherspoon and colleagues have argued that when individuals are assigned to population groups, two randomly chosen individuals from different populations can resemble each other more than a randomly chosen member of their own group. They found that many thousands of genetic markers had to be used for the answer to "How often is a pair of individuals from one population genetically more dissimilar than two individuals chosen from two different populations?" to be "Never". This assumed three population groups, separated by large geographic distances (European, African and East Asian). The global human population is more complex, and studying a large number of groups would require an increased number of markers for the same answer. They conclude that "caution should be used when using geographic or genetic ancestry to make inferences about individual phenotypes", and "The fact that, given enough genetic data, individuals can be correctly assigned to their populations of origin is compatible with the observation that most human genetic variation is found within populations, not between them. It is also compatible with our finding that, even when the most distinct populations are considered and hundreds of loci are used, individuals are frequently more similar to members of other populations than to members of their own population".

This is similar to the conclusion reached by anthropologist Norman Sauer in a 1992 article on the ability of forensic anthropologists to assign "race" to a skeleton, based on craniofacial features and limb morphology. Sauer said, "the successful assignment of race to a skeletal specimen is not a vindication of the race concept, but rather a prediction that an individual, while alive was assigned to a particular socially constructed 'racial' category. A specimen may display features that point to African ancestry. In this country that person is likely to have been labeled Black regardless of whether or not such a race actually exists in nature".

== See also ==
- List of Y-chromosome haplogroups in populations of the world
- History of anthropometry – History of measurements of humans, section; 4.2 Race, identity and cranio-facial description
- Human subspecies – Classification of the human species
- Human Genetic Diversity: Lewontin's Fallacy – 1972 scientific paper by Richard Lewontin
- Zionism, race and genetics
