= Wildlife of Vietnam =

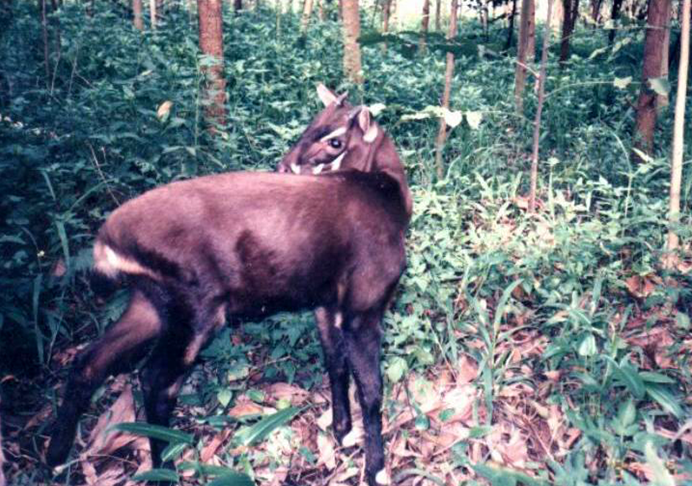
Saola (Pseudoryx nghetinhensis) discovered in Vietnam in 1992

The wildlife of Vietnam is rich in flora and fauna as reflected by its unique biodiversity. Saola, rare and antelope-like animal categorized under the bovine subfamily, was found in 1992 in Vũ Quang National Park. In the 1990s, three other muntjac species, the deer-like Truong Son muntjac (found in Bạch Mã National Park), giant muntjac (found in Vũ Quang National Park) and Pu Hoat muntjac (found in Pù Hoạt, Nghệ An), were also discovered. Conservation protection and scientific studies of the ecology of Vietnam, particularly in the protected forest areas, have been given priority attention by the Government of Vietnam. Laws were enacted to set up Xuân Thủy Wetland National Park, four UNESCO Biosphere Reserves, and Hạ Long Bay and Phong Nha-Kẻ Bàng National Parks; the last two are also designated as UNESCO World Heritage Sites.

The rich diversity of Vietnam's wildlife includes 11,400 species of vascular plants, 1030 species of moss, 310 species of mammals, 296 reptile species, 162 amphibian species, 700 freshwater species of fish and 2000 species of marine fish. There are about 889 species of birds and over 850 species of land mollusks. However, a study by the WWF has reported that nearly 10% of the wildlife in the country is threatened with extinction. Vietnam is placed 16th highest among 152 countries studied in terms of the proportion of its wildlife species found to be in danger.

== National parks ==
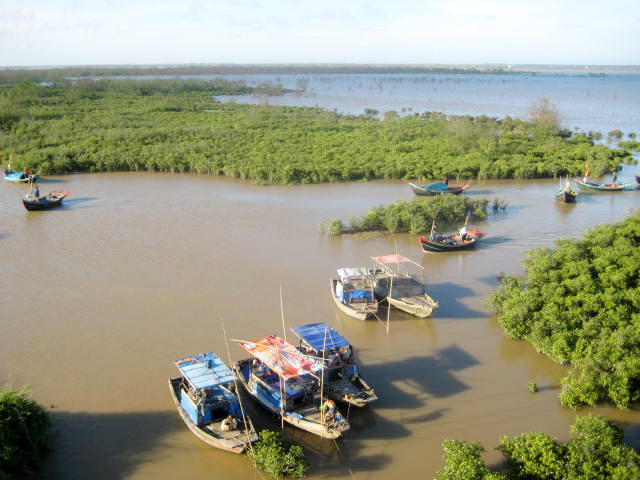
Landscape of Xuan Thuy National Park

While the national reserves cover small areas of scientific significance with restricted access, the national parks also cover wetlands of Ramsar designated areas and BirdLife International inscribed bird areas. The largest of the national parks initially covered were the Cuc Phuong National Park, the Cat Tien National Park, the Con Dao National Park and Con Dao National Park, which to start with, were forest areas along with being reserves or prohibited areas. The objective for creating national parks was to allow access to the reserved areas as a part of ecotourism and cultural needs with full attention to the basic approach of conservation of natural environmental resources.

The national parks and reserves, as per present status, (as reported by the national parks of Vietnam) conforming to the topography of the country which cover terrestrial, deltas of rivers, and coastal zones are: Five national parks and four reserves in the Mekong Delta; two national parks in the northeastern area; five reserves in the north western area; three parks in the Red River Delta; two parks and one reserve in the North Central Coastal area; two reserves in South Central Coastal area; three parks and one reserve in Central Highlands; one park and one reserve in south eastern area.

== Flora ==
The flora of Vietnam has existed in its current form since at least the Oligocene, as evidenced by the assemblage known as the Ha Long megafossil flora from the Oligocene-aged Dong Ho Formation, which outcrops in the Ha Long region.

The country was once totally covered with forests but over the years due to the war and deforestation and anthropological pressures some areas have lost their biodiversity value. The floral richness of the rain forest habitats comprise a broad range of evergreens. According to the Conservation International List Vietnam is identified as the fifth biodiversity hot spot in the world, on account of its exotic flora and fauna. Between 1997 and 2007, almost 1000 new species have been discovered. However, many areas still remain to be explored, and more species are likely to appear in the future. Natural forests are at higher elevations in the northwest and mangrove swamps are in the coastal areas. Rainforest in the hilly region has wild rhododendrons in the northwest along with dwarf bamboos and numerous types of orchids. The central dry region has pines and the river deltas have mangrove forests. The largest and the most conspicuous find in recent years is of the plant species in the Halong Bay area known as Halong fan palm. The largest species was the gum tree.

Considered one of the world biological diversification centers, the flora estimated is of the order of 12,000 species (veined flora) of which 9,628 have been recorded under 291 families. It includes 1000 endemic species. Trees, which provide timber, are of 1,000 species. Timber plants are 100 species. Commercially usable species are 352 species including 42 listed as precious tree species. Further categorization of the flora relates to 76 aromatic spices, 160 species providing vegetable oils, and also herbal species. Some of the well known herbal species are: ginseng, Coscinium fenestratum, Coptis teeta, Panax vietnamensis, and Stephania.

== Fauna ==
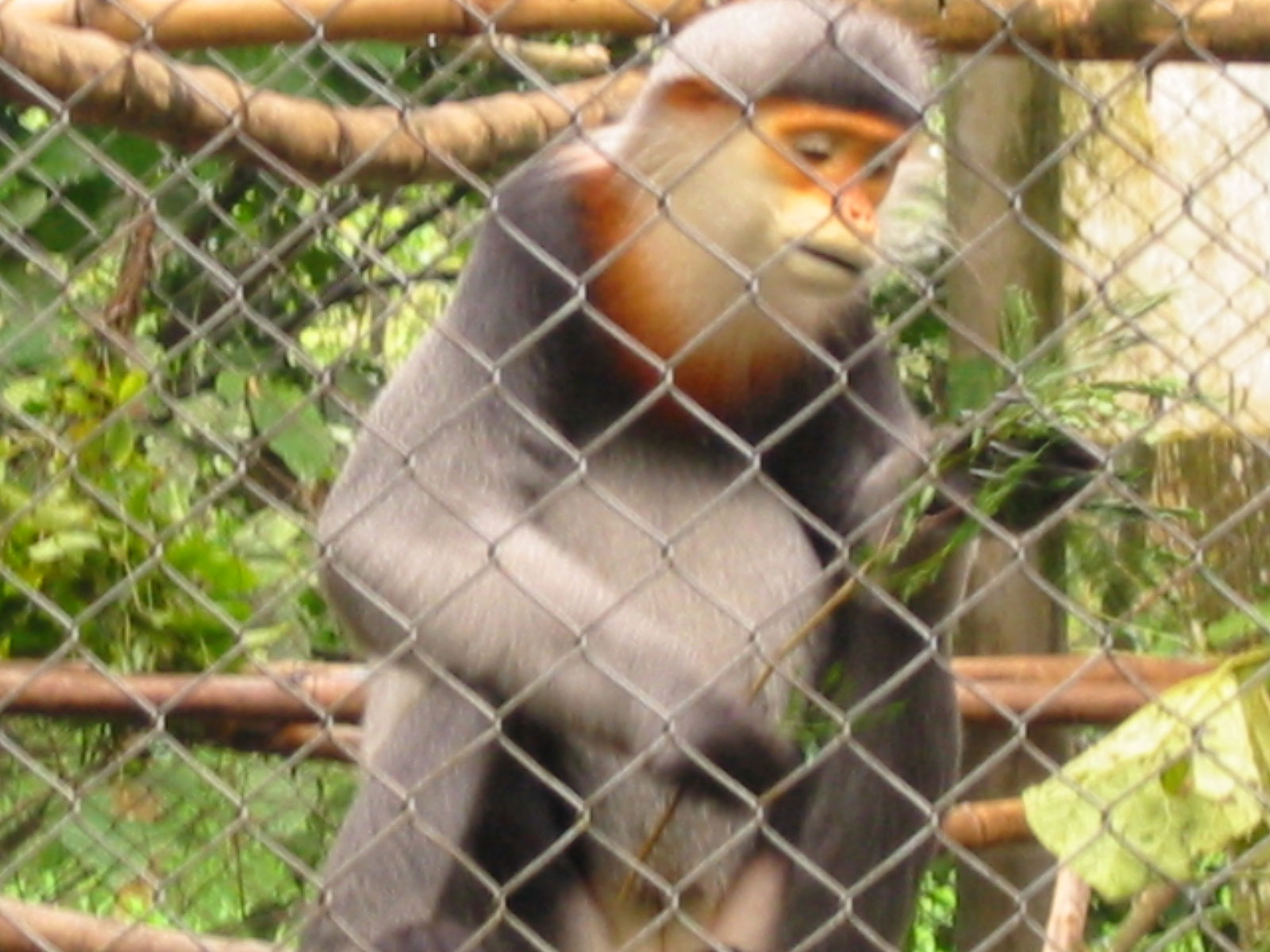
Grey-shanked douc langur at Cuc Phuong Primate Rehabilitation Center

Faunal species noted are accounted as 11,217 species of animals, in Vietnam's hot and humid climate. These are broadly: Indian elephants, bears (black bear and honey bear), Indochinese tigers and Indochinese leopards as well as smaller animals like pygmy lorises, monkeys (such as snub-nosed monkey), bats, flying squirrels, turtles and otters. Reptiles such as crocodiles, snakes and lizards are also reported. Specifically the faunal species which are endemic to Vietnam are the following. While many variety of animals have become extinct like the Northern Sumatran rhinoceros, the protection of large animals have been addressed. The Vietnamese Javan rhinoceros used to live throughout the region of Vietnam but was declared extinct in 2010 when the last remaining individual was found dead with the horn removed.

There are also 2,470 species of fish, more than 23,000 species of corals and many species of invertebrates recorded in the wildlife of Vietnam.

== Mammals ==
=== Primates ===
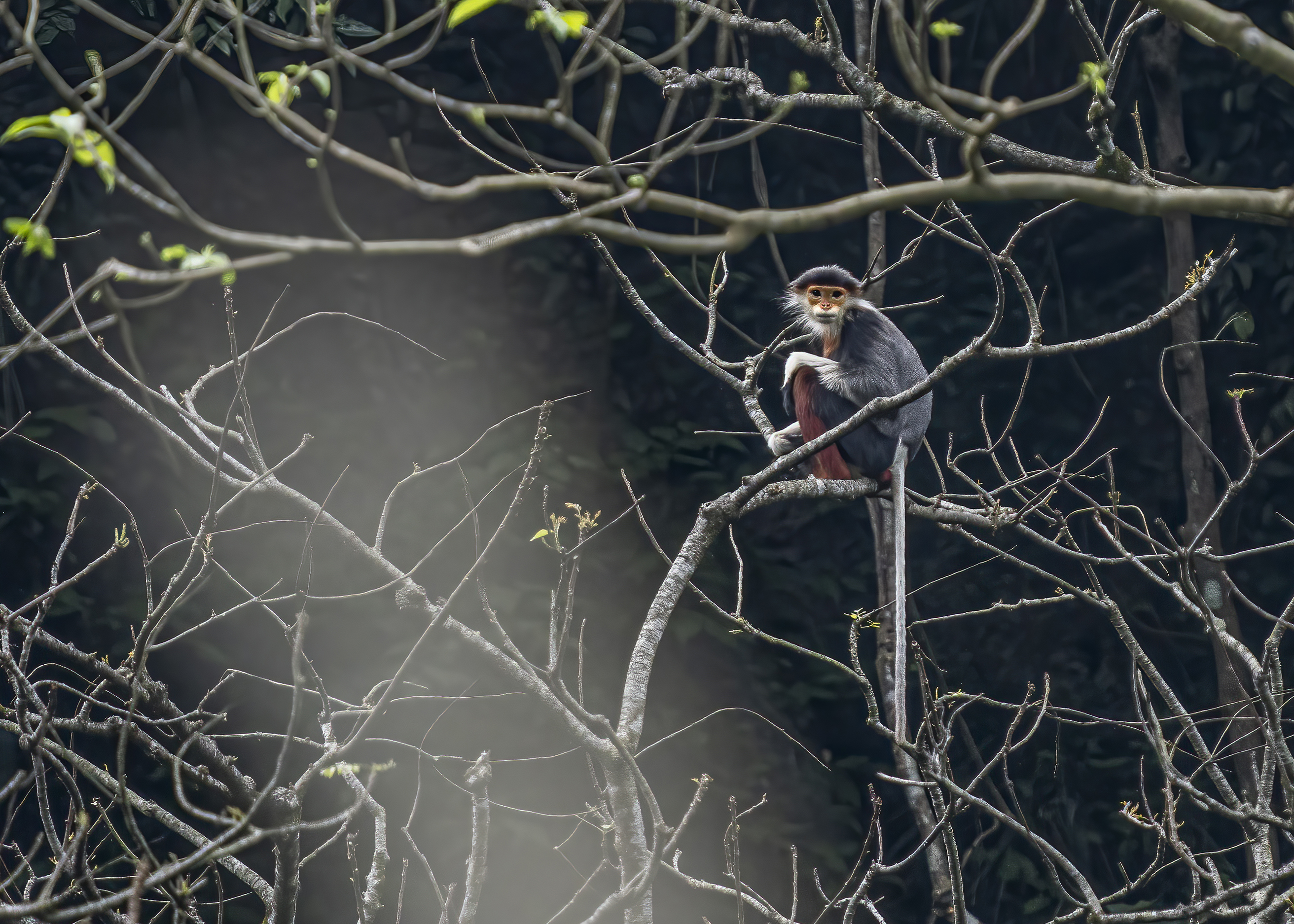
Red-shanked douc

- Hatinh langur
- Francois' langur
- Black-crested gibbon
- White-cheeked gibbon
- Southern white-cheeked gibbon
- Red-shanked douc
- Black-shanked douc
- Gray-shanked douc
- Tonkin snub-nosed monkey
- Stump-tailed macaque
- Pygmy loris
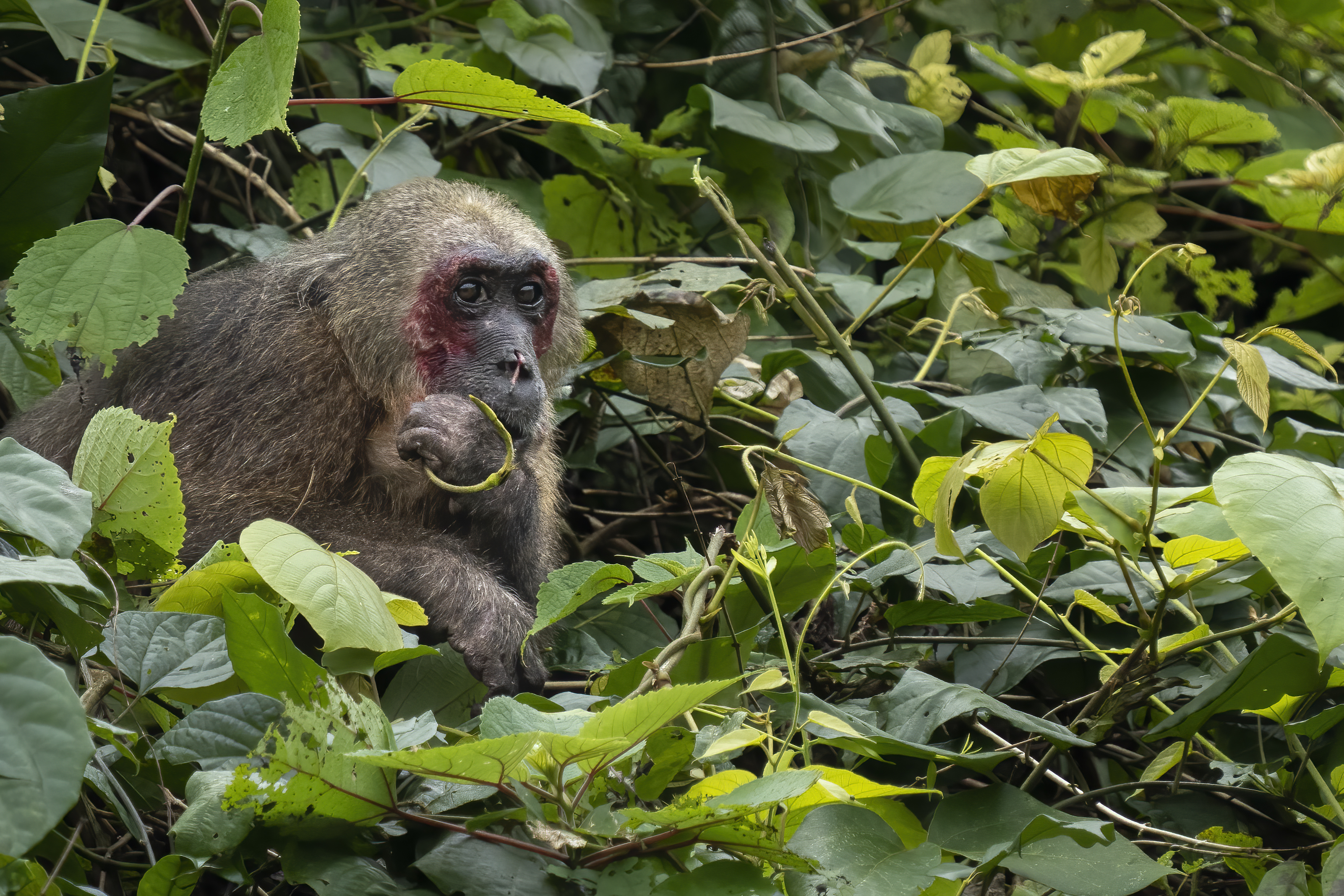
  Stump-tailed macaque eating
- Crab-eating macaque
- Pig-tailed macaque

=== Cats ===
- Indochinese tiger
- Leopard cat
- Marbled cat
- Jungle cat
- Clouded leopard
- Asian golden cat
- Indochinese leopard

=== Civets ===
- Large Indian civet
- Large-spotted civet
- Small Indian civet
- Owston's palm civet
- Asian palm civet
- Binturong
- Masked palm civet
- Small-toothed palm civet

=== Deer ===
- Giant muntjac
- Indian muntjac
- Truong Son muntjac
- Vietnamese sika deer
- Sambar deer

=== Elephants ===
- Indian elephant

=== Bovine ===
- Banteng
- Kouprey
- Saola
- Gaur
- Water buffalo

=== Rhinoceros ===
- Northern Sumatran rhinoceros which is officially extinct in Vietnam and on the IUCN Red List.
- Vietnamese Javan rhinoceros which is officially extinct in Vietnam and on the IUCN Red List.

=== Cetacea ===
- Chinese white dolphin
- Finless porpoise (narrow-ridged finless porpoise)
- Irrawaddy dolphin
- Spinner dolphin

=== Sirenia ===
- Dugong

== Reptiles ==
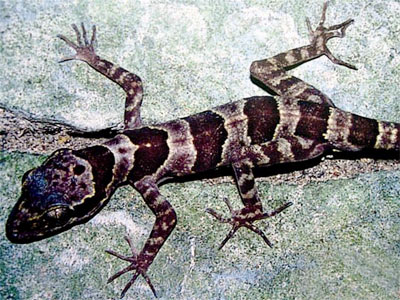
A new species of gecko (Cyrtodactylus phongnhakebangensis) found in Phong Nha-Kẻ Bàng National Park

Perhaps a third of Vietnam's 484 identified reptile species are endemic, and new species are regularly discovered. These species are often found in particular hotspots, for example 32 endemic species are found within the Annamite Range. The IUCN Red List has listings for 74 threatened species, which does not include species which are too data deficient for assessments to be made. Many species are known only from a single location, and only around a fifth of species (and 23% the Red List species) have captive populations. Such populations can be crucial for a species to survive, for example the Vietnamese pond turtle is present in captivity despite being rare or extinct in the wild.

=== Turtles/tortoises ===
- Elongated tortoise (Indotestudo elongata)
- Vietnamese pond turtle (Mauremys annamensis)
- Asian forest tortoise (Manouria emys)
- Green sea turtle (Chelonia mydas)
- Hawksbill turtle (Eretmochelys imbricata)
- Leatherback sea turtle (Dermochelys coriacea)
- Asian giant softshell turtle (Pelochelys cantorii)
- Yangtze giant softshell turtle (Rafetus swinhoei)

=== Lizards ===
==== Agamids ====
- Chinese water dragon (Physignathus cocincinus)
- Short-footed lizard (Acanthosaura brachypoda)
- Mountain horned-dragon (Acanthosaura capra)
- Crowned spiny lizard (Acanthosaura coronata)
- Brown pricklenape (Acanthosaura lepidogaster)
- Murphy's agama (Acanthosaura murphyi)
- Natalie's agama (Acanthosaura nataliae)
- Phong Dien agama (Acanthosaura phongdienensis)
- Short-spined agama (Acanthosaura prasina)
- Banded japalure (Diploderma fasciatum)

==== Geckos ====
- Adler's gecko (Gekko adleri)
- Ba Na dwarf gecko (Hemiphyllodactylus banaensis)

==== Monitors ====
- Clouded monitor (Varanus nebulosus)
- Water monitor (Varanus salvator)

==== Skinks ====
- Chinese short-limbed skink (Ateuchosaurus chinensis)

=== Snakes ===
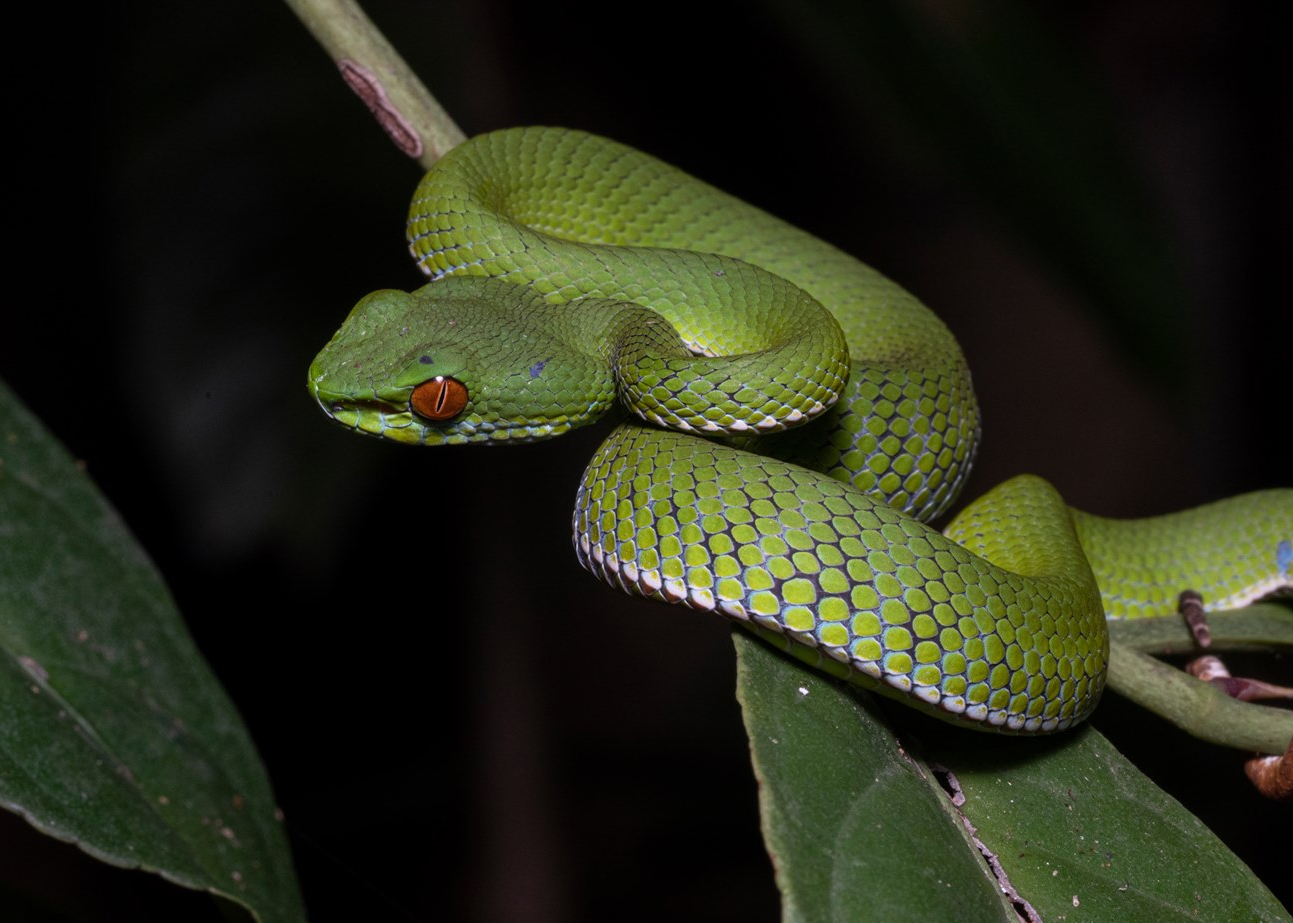
Ruby-eyed viper

==== Venomous ====
- Mountain pit viper (Ovophis monticola)
- Sharp-nosed viper (Deinagkistrodon acutus)
- Jerdon's pit viper (Protobothrops jerdonii)
- Brown-spotted pit-viper (Protobothrops mucrosquamatus)
- Three-horned pit-viper (Protobothrops sieversorum)
- Stejneger's bamboo viper (Trimeresurus stejnegeri)
- Ruby-eyed pit-viper (Trimeresurus rubeus)
- White-lipped pit-viper (Trimeresurus albolabris)
- King cobra (Ophiophagus hannah)
- Monocled cobra (Naja kaouthia)
- Indochinese spitting cobra (Naja siamensis)
- Chinese cobra (Naja atra)

==== Non-venomous ====
- Reticulated python
- Burmese python
- Red-tailed green ratsnake
- Vietnam blue beauty ratsnake

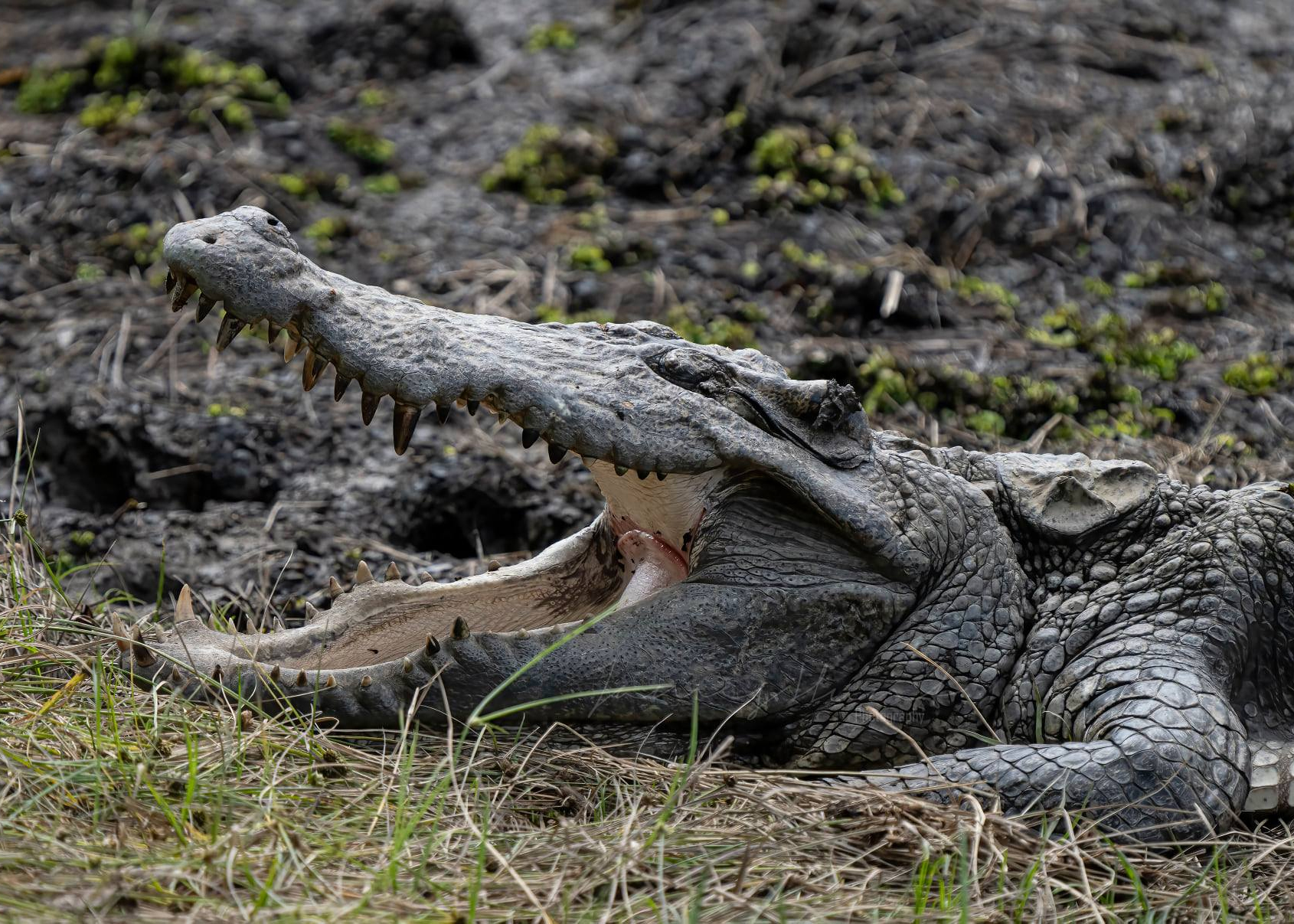
Siamese crocodile basking in sun

=== Crocodilians ===
- Saltwater crocodile, which has been extinct in Vietnam since at least the 1980s.
- Siamese crocodile which is critically endangered on the IUCN Red List and, in Vietnam, is currently only found within Cat Tien National Park, but was much more widespread historically.

== Birds ==
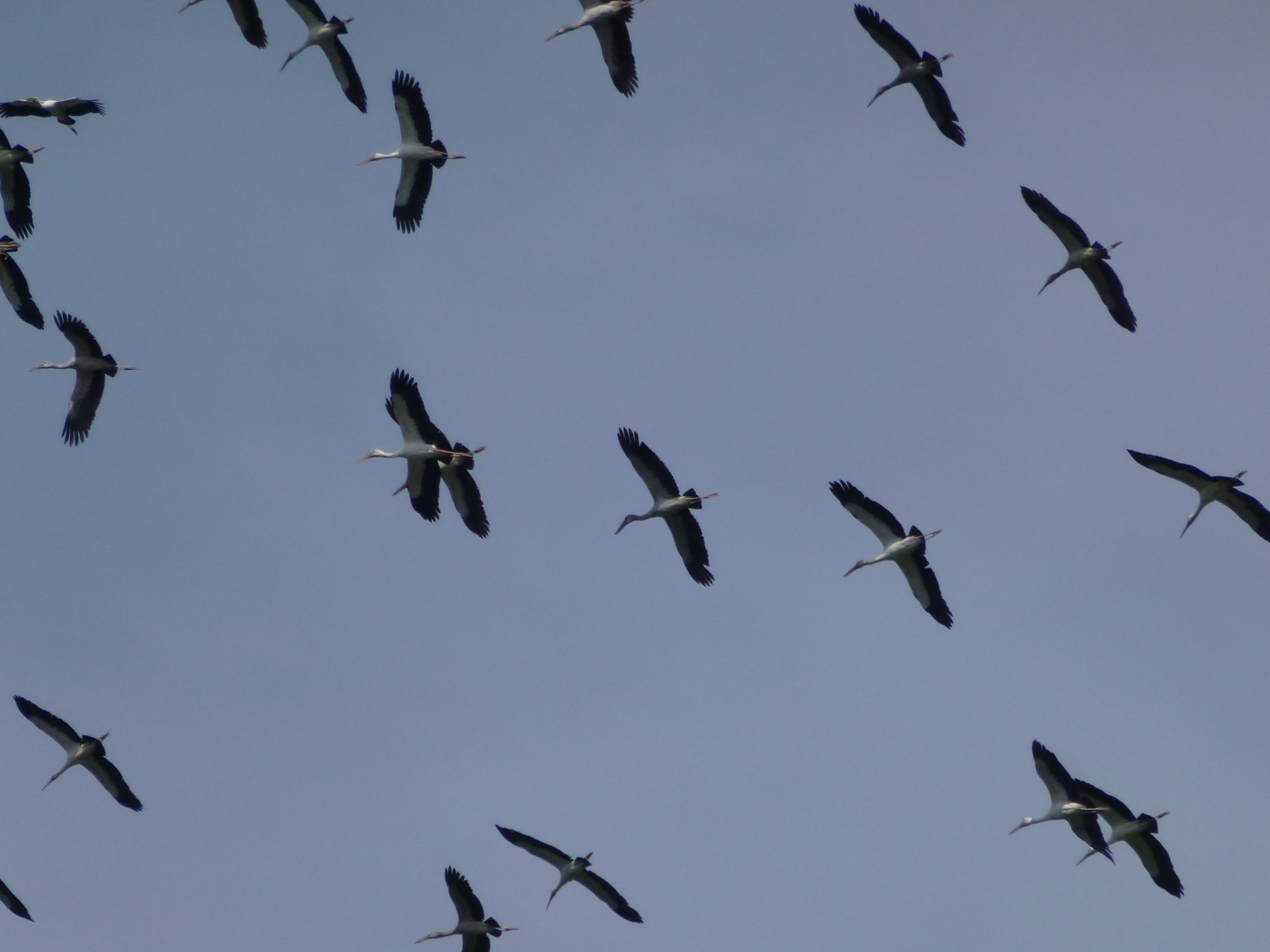
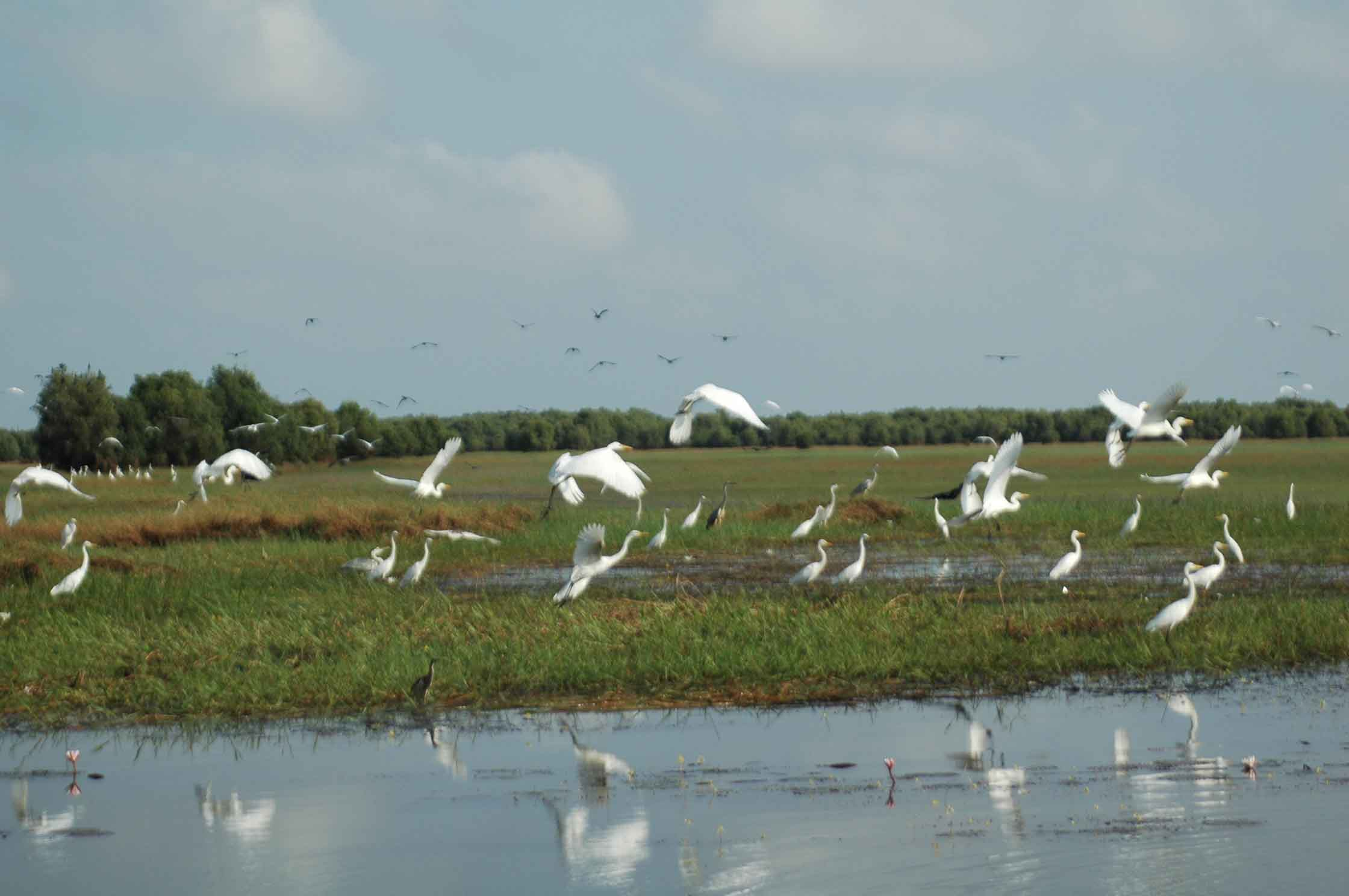
Left: Anastomus oscitans in Tram Chim National Park, Dong Thap Province, Vietnam. Right: Wetland at Tram Chim National Park

Rare and little known birds have been identified such as the Edward's pheasant which was believed to be extinct, the white-winged wood duck and the white-shouldered ibis. The country lies on the east Asian flyway of Siberian birds and is an important stopover for migratory waders.

According to the BirdLife International records of 2011, the avifauna recorded are of 889 species, which includes 18 endemic species, 44 globally threatened species and 6 introduced species. The globally threatened species are listed under the following three categories, excluding vulnerable category.

Near-threatened
The near threatened species listed by IBA are:

- Falcated duck (Anas falcata)
- Ferruginous duck (Aythya nyroca)
- Chestnut-necklaced partridge (Arborophila charltonii)
- Siamese fireback (Lophura diardi)
- Germain's peacock-pheasant (Polyplectron germaini)
- Platalea minor (Ichthyophaga humilis)
- Gray-headed fish-eagle (Ichthyophaga ichthyaetus)
- Cinereous vulture (Aegypius monachus)
- White-rumped falcon (Polihierax insignis)
- Laggar falcon (Falco jugger)
- Corn crake (Crex crex)
- Band-bellied crake (Porzana paykullii)
- Malaysian plover (Charadrius peronii)
- Eurasian curlew (Numenius arquata)
- Black-tailed godwit (Limosa limosa)
- Asian dowitcher (Limnodromus semipalmatus)
- Black-bellied tern (Sterna acuticauda)
- Nicobar pigeon (Caloenas nicobarica)
- Blue-rumped parrot (Psittinus cyanurus)
- Long-tailed parakeet (Psittacula longicauda)
- Black-bellied malkoha (Phaenicophaeus diardi)
- Ward's trogon (Harpactes wardi)
- Blyth's kingfisher (Alcedo hercules)
- Black hornbill (Anthracoceros malayanus)
- Great hornbill (Buceros bicornis)
- Brown hornbill (Anorrhinus austeni)
- White-crowned hornbill (Aceros comatus)
- Red-collared woodpecker (Picus rabieri)
- Japanese paradise-flycatcher (Terpsiphone atrocaudata)
- Collared crow (Corvus torquatus)
- Yellow-billed nuthatch (Sitta solangiae)
- Streaked bulbul (Ixos malaccensis)
- Black-headed parrotbill (Paradoxornis margaritae)
- Rufous-rumped grassbird (Graminicola bengalensis)
- Short-tailed scimitar-babbler (Jabouilleia danjoui)
- Black-hooded laughingthrush (Garrulax milleti);
- Vietnamese cutia (Cutia legalleni)
- Scarlet-breasted flowerpecker (Prionochilus thoracicus)
- Mekong wagtail (Motacilla samveasnae)
- Vietnamese greenfinch (Chloris monguilloti)
- Asian golden weaver (Ploceus hypoxanthus)

Endangered
The endangered list covers the following species.

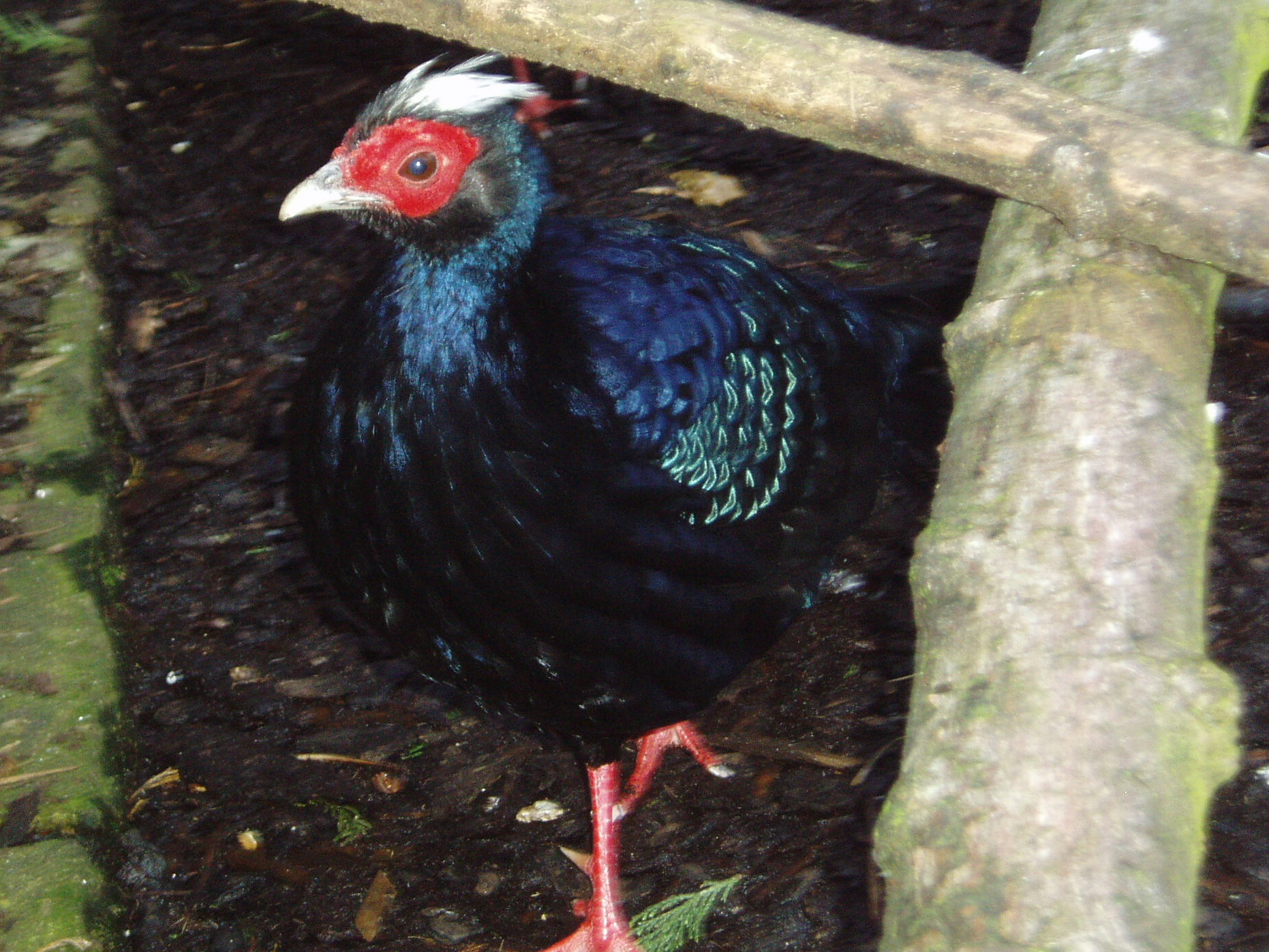
Male Edward's pheasant

- White-winged duck (Cairina scutulata)
- Baer's pochard (Aythya baeri)
- Scaly-sided merganser (Mergus squamatus)
- Orange-necked partridge (Arborophila davidi)
- Edwards's pheasant (Lophura edwardsi)
- Vietnamese pheasant
- Black-faced spoonbill
- Lesser fish-eagle (Platalea minor)
- Nordmann's greenshank (Tringa guttifer)
- Collared laughingthrush (Garrulax yersini)
- Gray-crowned crocias (Crocias langbianis)
- Sooty babbler (Stachyris herberti)

Critically endangered
The list of critically endangered species identified by IBA is given below.

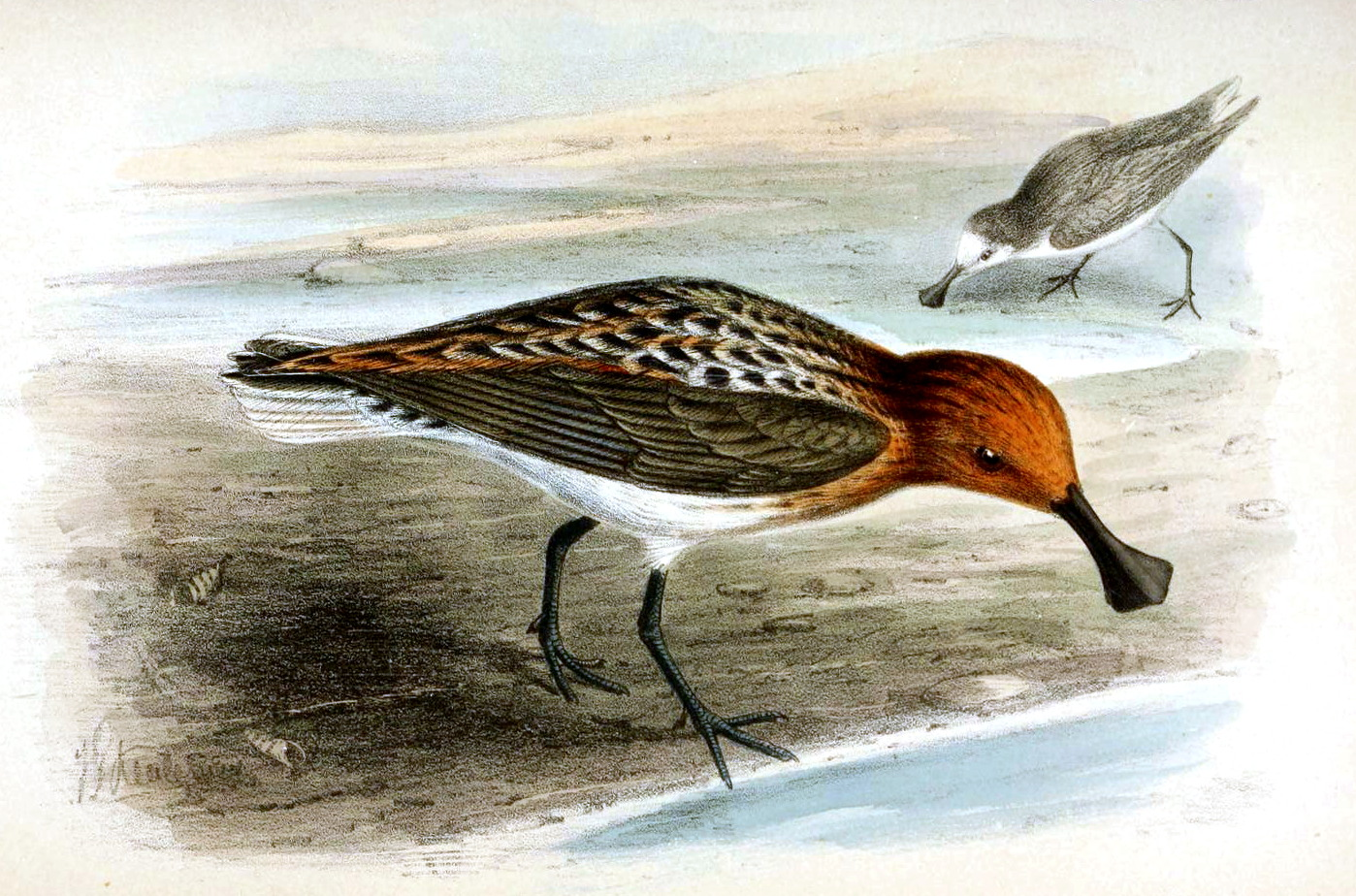
Spoon-billed sandpiper (Eurynorhynchus pygmeus)

- Christmas Island frigatebird (Fregata andrewsi)
- White-shouldered ibis (Pseudibis davisoni)
- Giant ibis (Pseudibis gigantea)
- White-rumped vulture (Gyps bengalensis)
- Indian vulture (Gyps indicus)
- Red-headed vulture (Sarcogyps calvus)
- Bengal florican (Houbaropsis bengalensis)
- Spoon-billed sandpiper (Eurynorhynchus pygmeus)

== Molluscs ==
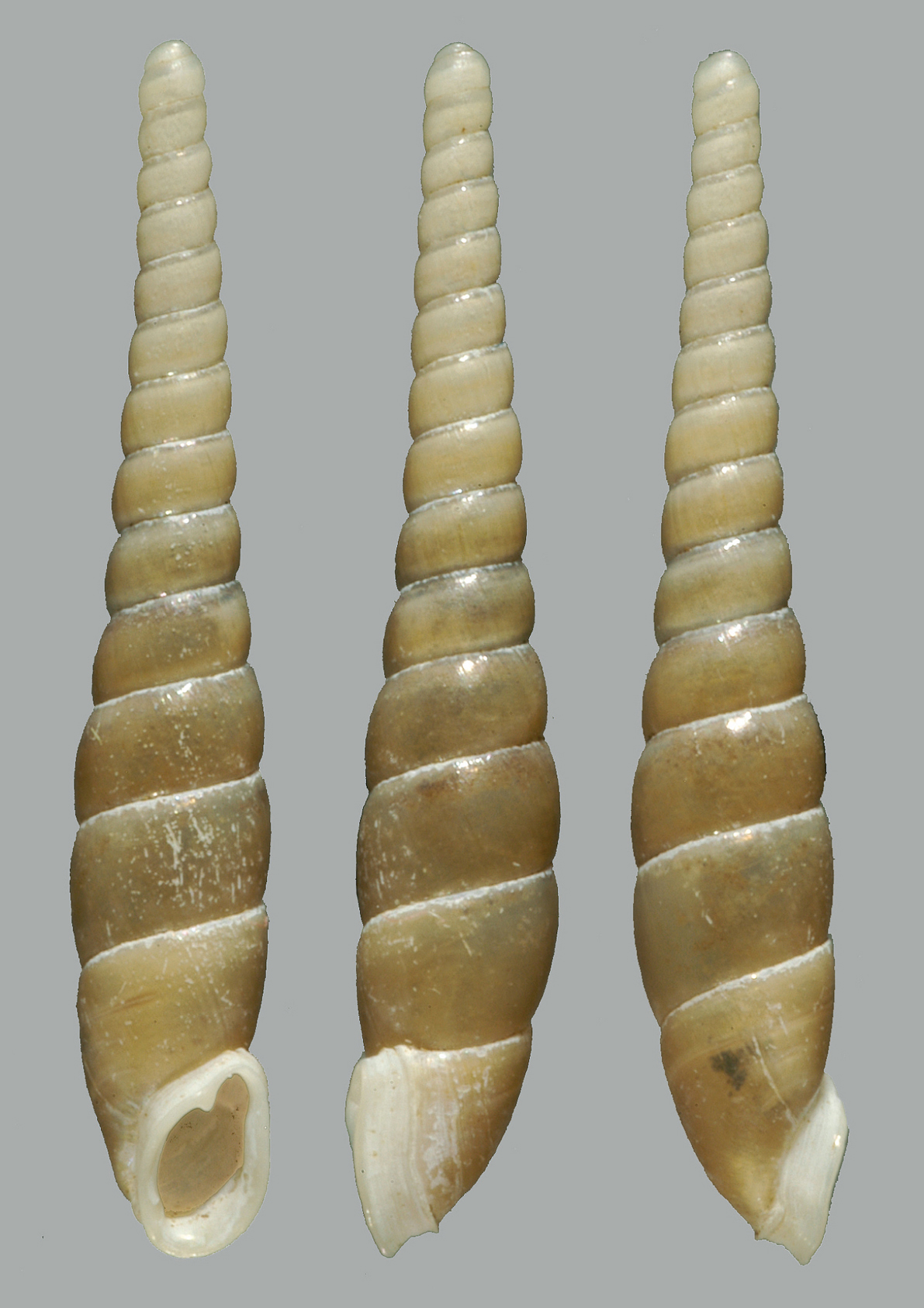
Three views of a shell of the land snail species Leptacme cuongi

=== Marine molluscs ===
The marine molluscan fauna of Vietnam includes numerous species of chitons, gastropods, tusk shells, cephalopods and bivalves.

=== Non-marine molluscs ===
Vietnam's fauna of non-marine molluscs comprises various species of freshwater gastropods, freshwater bivalves and terrestrial gastropods. The terrestrial gastropod fauna is highly diverse and includes more than 850 described land snail and slug species; many species inhabit limestone karst hills.

== Threats and conservation ==
The protected areas in Vietnam have suffered a decline over the past several decades. The reasons adduced to this situation are; the Vietnam war, deforestation, hunting, export of animals under CITES agreement which is generally violated by illegal activity due to inadequate patrolling. Illegal trade in wildlife is flourishing in Vietnam as there is great demand for these animals in China and also within the country. They have commercial value both at home and abroad.

Trade in wildlife resources in Vietnam is of considerable value. In respect of faunal species, trade varies between 3,700 and 4,500 tons; the use of faunal species are also for medical purposes, pets, and as food and ornamentation but excludes trade in aquatic species. Insects are also a valuable source of trade with beetle and Lepidoptera species contributing towards a major share. Medicinal plants are also harvested and its trade is of the order of 20,000 tons.

Continuous conservation efforts by the Government of Vietnam have brought more and more areas under protected status. Logging operations have been banned. The conservation efforts are showing positive results with wildlife becoming re-established in many reforested areas. Mangrove forest areas are on the rise due to renewed planting. Fish fauna and crustaceans are proliferating and birds are seen more frequently. As a result of conservation efforts, Siamese crocodile numbers have recovered on account of their reintroduction to ponds within the parks.

== See also ==
- Protected areas of Vietnam
- List of fauna of Hà Giang
- List of amphibians of Hoàng Liên National Park

== Bibliography ==
- Ray, Nick; Balasingamchow, Yu-Mei (15 September 2010). Vietnam. Lonely Planet. p. 394. ISBN 978-1-74220-389-8.
