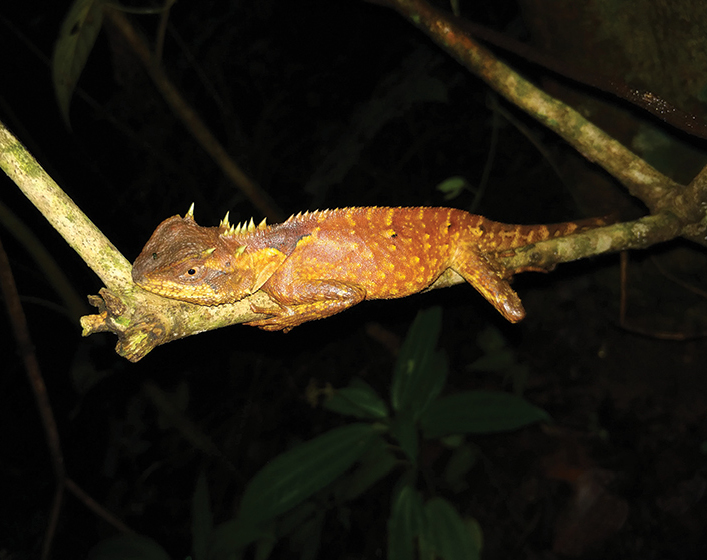
- female

Scientific classification
- Kingdom: Animalia
- Phylum: Chordata
- Class: Reptilia
- Order: Squamata
- Suborder: Iguania
- Family: Agamidae
- Genus: Acanthosaura
- Species: A. tongbiguanensis

Binomial name
- Acanthosaura tongbiguanensis Liu & Rao, 2019

= Acanthosaura tongbiguanensis =

Species of lizard

Acanthosaura tongbiguanensis is a species of agama found in China. It is a medium-sized agamid lizard with a snout–vent length of 93.0–115.6 mm (3.66–4.55 in). It is known only from the Tongbiguan Nature Reserve in Yunnan, China, but probably also occurs in northern Myanmar. The type specimens were collected at night while they were asleep on small trees in a primordial forest. During the day, the species probably forages for food on the ground.

== Taxonomy ==
Acanthosaura tongbiguanensis was described by the herpetologists Shuo Liu and Dingqi Rao in 2019 on the basis of an adult male specimen collected from Tongbiguan Township in Yunnan, China. Specimens of the species had previously been misidentified as belonging to Acanthosaura lepidogaster. It is named after the Tongbiguan Nature Reserve where it was first collected.

== Description ==
Acanthosaura tongbiguanensis is a medium-sized agamid lizard with a snout–vent length of 93.0–115.6 mm (3.66–4.55 in). It has two pairs of spines: the postorbital (supraciliary) spines and spines on the occiput between the tympanum and nuchal crest. The tympanum is naked and the gular pouch is moderately developed. The scales on the flanks are randomly intermixed with medium and large scales. The nuchal crest is present and strongly developed. The diastema between the nuchal and dorsal crests are present. The dorsal crest is slightly developed and is composed of enlarged, pointed scales beginning at the shoulder region and decreasing regularly in size. The tail is 1.56–1.85 times the snout–vent length. It has a black nuchal collar, black eye patch, and black oblique folds anterior to the forelimb insertions present.

Acanthosaura tongbiguanensis can be separated from all other species in its genus by the number of subdigital lamellae on the fourth finger (19–21) and toe (25–28) and the shape of its black eye patch. The eye patch extends from the posterior margin of the nostrils through the orbit posteriorly and downwards beyond the posterior end of the tympanum, but does not meet the diamond shaped black nuchal collar on nape or black oblique humeral fold.

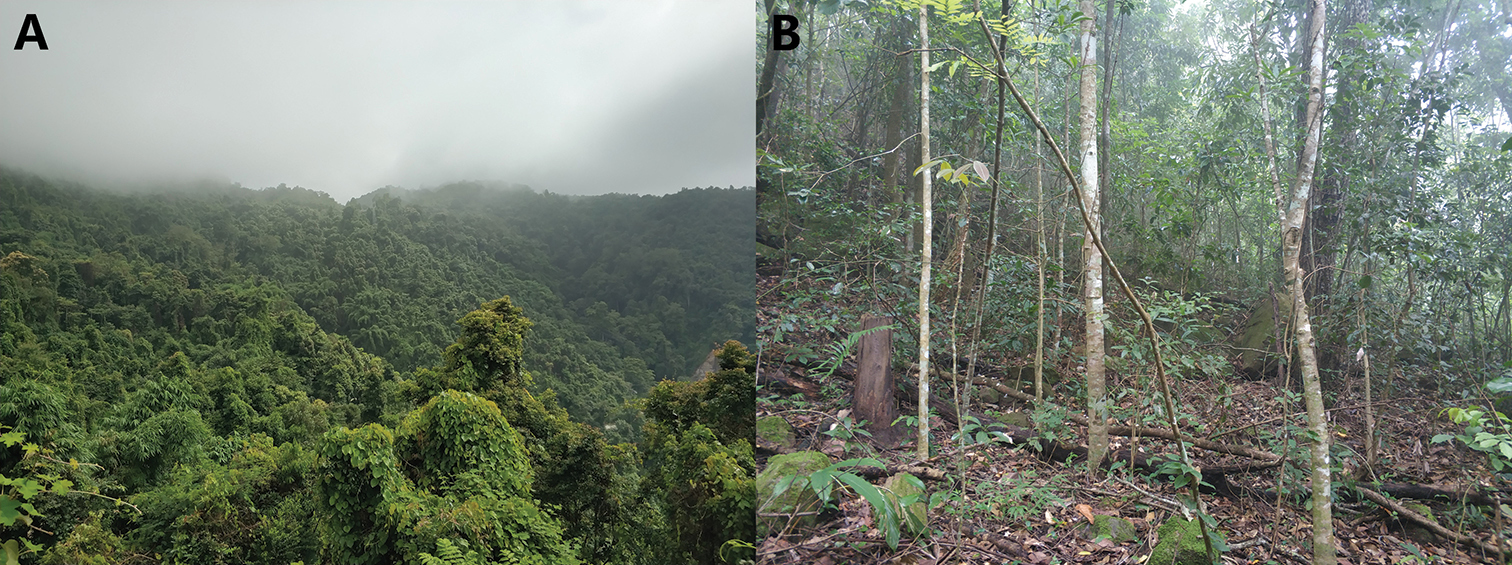
Habitat at Acanthosaura tongbiguanensis' type locality

== Distribution and habitat ==
The lizard is known only from the Tongbiguan Nature Reserve in Yunnan, China, including Yingjiang County, Longchuan County, and Ruili City. It is found near China's border with Myanmar, so it is probably also found in northern Myanmar.

The type specimens were collected at night while they were asleep on small trees in a primordial forest. During the day, the species probably forages for food on the ground.
