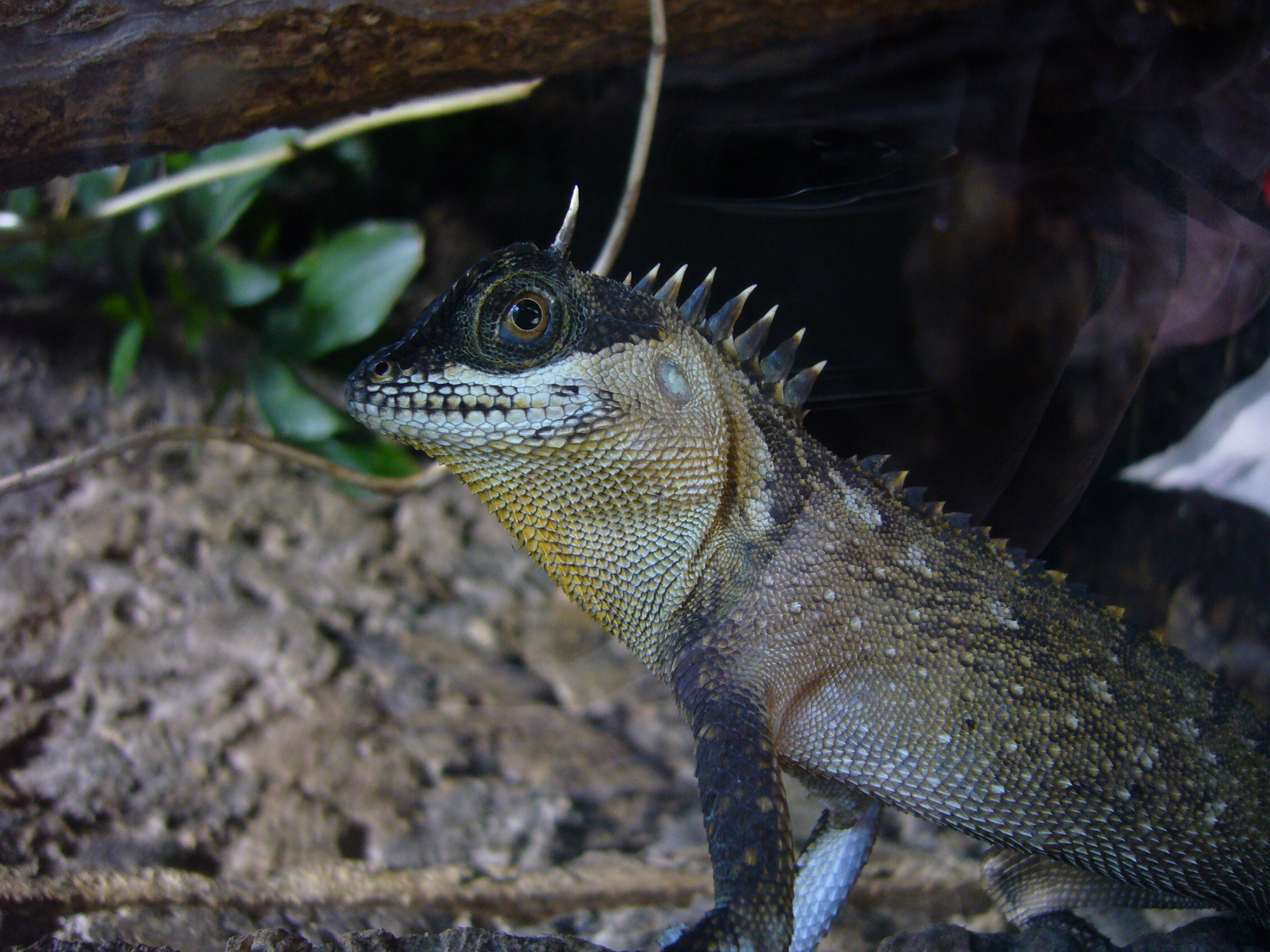
- Acanthosaura sp.

Scientific classification
- Kingdom: Animalia
- Phylum: Chordata
- Class: Reptilia
- Order: Squamata
- Suborder: Iguania
- Family: Agamidae
- Subfamily: Draconinae
- Genus: Acanthosaura; Gray, 1831

= Acanthosaura =

Genus of lizards

Acanthosaura is a genus of lizards, commonly known as mountain horned dragons or pricklenape agamas, in the family Agamidae. The common name "pricklenape" refers to a row of dorsal spines which runs down the back of the neck. They are arboreal lizards found in Southeast Asia. They are medium-sized, their total length (including tail) ranging from about 7.5 to 15 in (19 to 38 cm), depending on species and individual. As the common name "mountain horned dragons" implies, they tend to prefer higher elevation areas with dense vegetation.

== Diet ==
Mountain horned dragons are insectivorous, consuming only live food. Common foods in captivity include crickets, earthworms, silkworms, mealworms, moths, roaches, wax worms, and grasshoppers. They require a variety in diet and will often refuse food when offered in excessive redundancy.

Typical Acanthosaura feeding behavior is a sit-and-wait style. They will perch 1 to 2 m (3.3 to 6.6 ft) off the ground until they spot their prey, which is often down on the ground. A display of aerobatics is not uncommon from Acanthosaura species when hunting food. They will eat and hunt fish, but most will not submerge their heads to catch a meal.

== Reproduction ==
Females of the genus Acanthosaura lay their first clutch of eggs about four months after mating. They may lay up to four clutches total per year, separated by a month or two.

== In captivity ==
Mountain horned dragons are popular pets, and readily available in the exotic pet trade. A. capra is considered the hardiest and most easily kept species of the genus, and is the most common species found for sale in the United States. While not considered to be difficult to breed in captivity, most specimens available are wild caught. However, due to captive breeding, more and more captive bred lizards are available.

== Species ==
Image	Scientific name	Common name	Distribution
	Acanthosaura armata (Gray, 1827)	armored pricklenape, peninsular horned tree lizard	Burma, China, Indonesia, Malaysia, Thailand
	Acanthosaura aurantiacrista Trivalairat, Kunya, Chanhome, Sumontha, Vasaruchapong, Chomngam, Chiangkul, 2020		Thailand
	Acanthosaura bintangensis Wood, J. Grismer, L. Grismer, Ahmad, Onn & Bauer, 2009	Bukit Larut Mountain horned agamid, Bintang horned tree lizard	Perak, Peninsular Malaysia
	Acanthosaura brachypoda Ananjeva, Orlov, Nguyen T.T. & Ryabov, 2011		Vietnam
	Acanthosaura capra (Günther, 1861)	green pricklenape	Cambodia, Laos, Vietnam
	Acanthosaura cardamomensis Wood, J. Grismer, L. Grismer, Neang, Chav & Holden, 2010		western Cambodia, eastern Thailand
	Acanthosaura coronata Günther, 1861	crowned spiny lizard	Vietnam
	Acanthosaura crucigera (Boulenger, 1885)	Boulenger's pricklenape, masked horned tree lizard	Burma, Cambodia, Malaysia, Thailand, Vietnam
	Acanthosaura lepidogaster (Cuvier, 1829)	brown pricklenape	Burma, Cambodia, China, Thailand, Vietnam
	Acanthosaura liui Liu, Hou, Mo ,& Rao, 2020		China
	Acanthosaura longicaudata Liu, Rao, Hou, Orlov, Ananjeva, & Zhang, 2022	long-tailed horned tree lizard, long-tailed horned agamid	China
	Acanthosaura meridiona Trivalairat, Sumontha, Kunya, & Chiangkul, 2022		Thailand
	Acanthosaura murphyi L.T. Nguyen, Do, Hoang, T.T. Nguyen, McCormack, T.Q. Nguyen, Orlov, V.D.H. Nguyen & S.N. Nguyen, 2018		Central Vietnam
	Acanthosaura nataliae Orlov, Q.T. Nguyen & V.S. Nguyen, 2006		Vietnam
	Acanthosaura phongdienensis S.N. Nguyen, Jin, Vo, L.T. Nguyen, Zhou, Che, Murphy, & Zhang, 2019		Vietnam
	Acanthosaura phuketensis Pauwels, Sumontha, Kunya, Nitikul, Samphanthamit, Wood & L. Grismer, 2015	Phuket horned tree agamid	southwestern Thailand
	Acanthosaura prasina Ananjeva, Ermakov, Nguyen, Nguyen, Murphy, Lukonina, Orlov, 2020		Vietnam
	Acanthosaura rubrilabris Liu, Rao, Hou, Orlov, Ananjeva, & Zhang, 2022	red-lipped horned tree lizard, red-lipped horned agamid	China
	Acanthosaura syrax P. Trivalairat, K. Trivalairat, N. Moungkhaek, S. Caponov, & B. Lorsunyaluck, 2026		western Thailand
	Acanthosaura titiwangsaensis Wood, J. Grismer, L. Grismer, Ahmad, Onn & Bauer, 2009	Malayan Mountain horned agamid, Titiwangsa horned tree lizard	Fraser's Hill and Cameron Highlands, Pahang, and Peninsular Malaysia
	Acanthosaura tongbiguanensis Liu & Rao, 2019		China

== Gallery ==
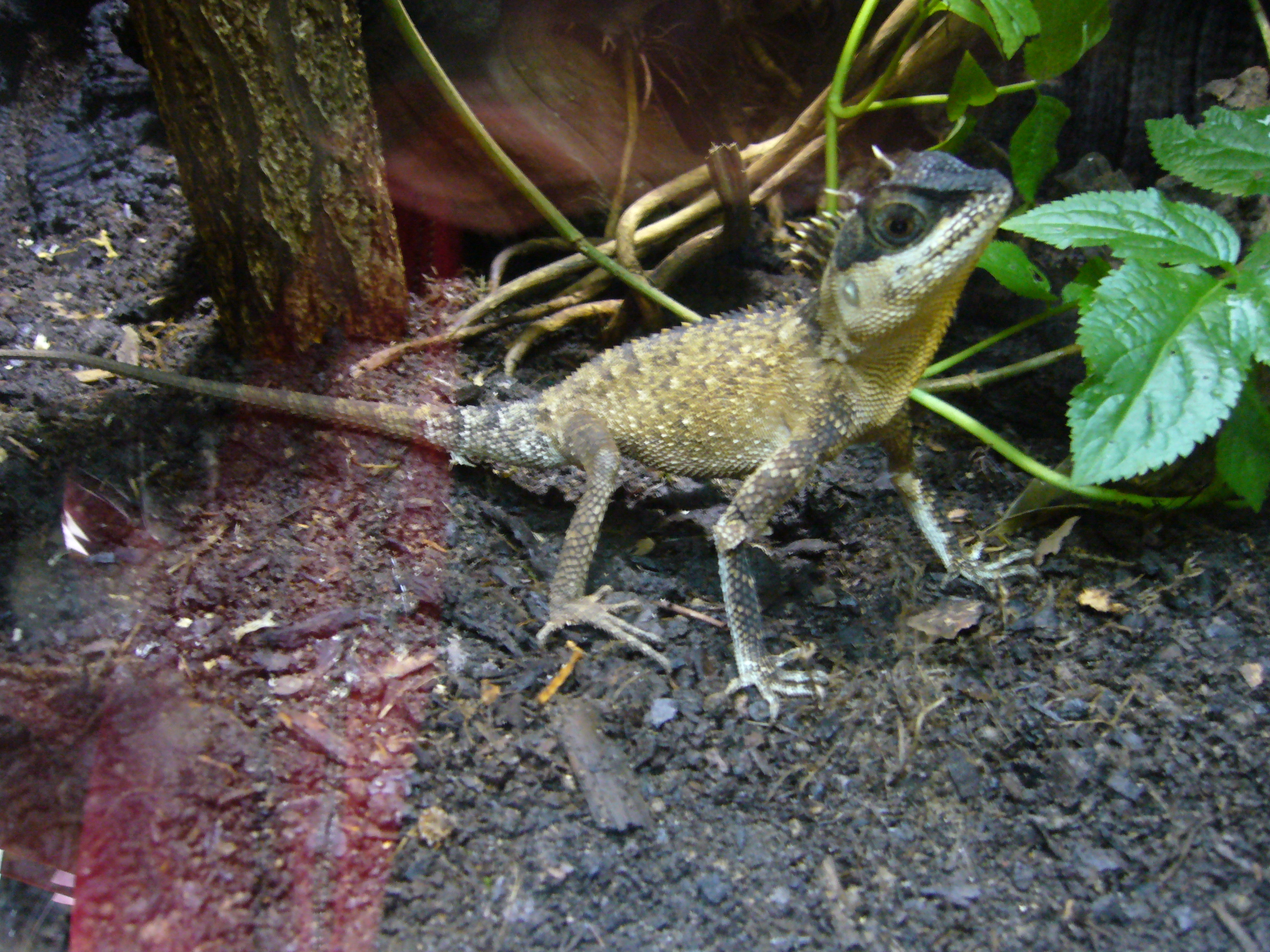
Acanthosaura capra at Chester Zoo

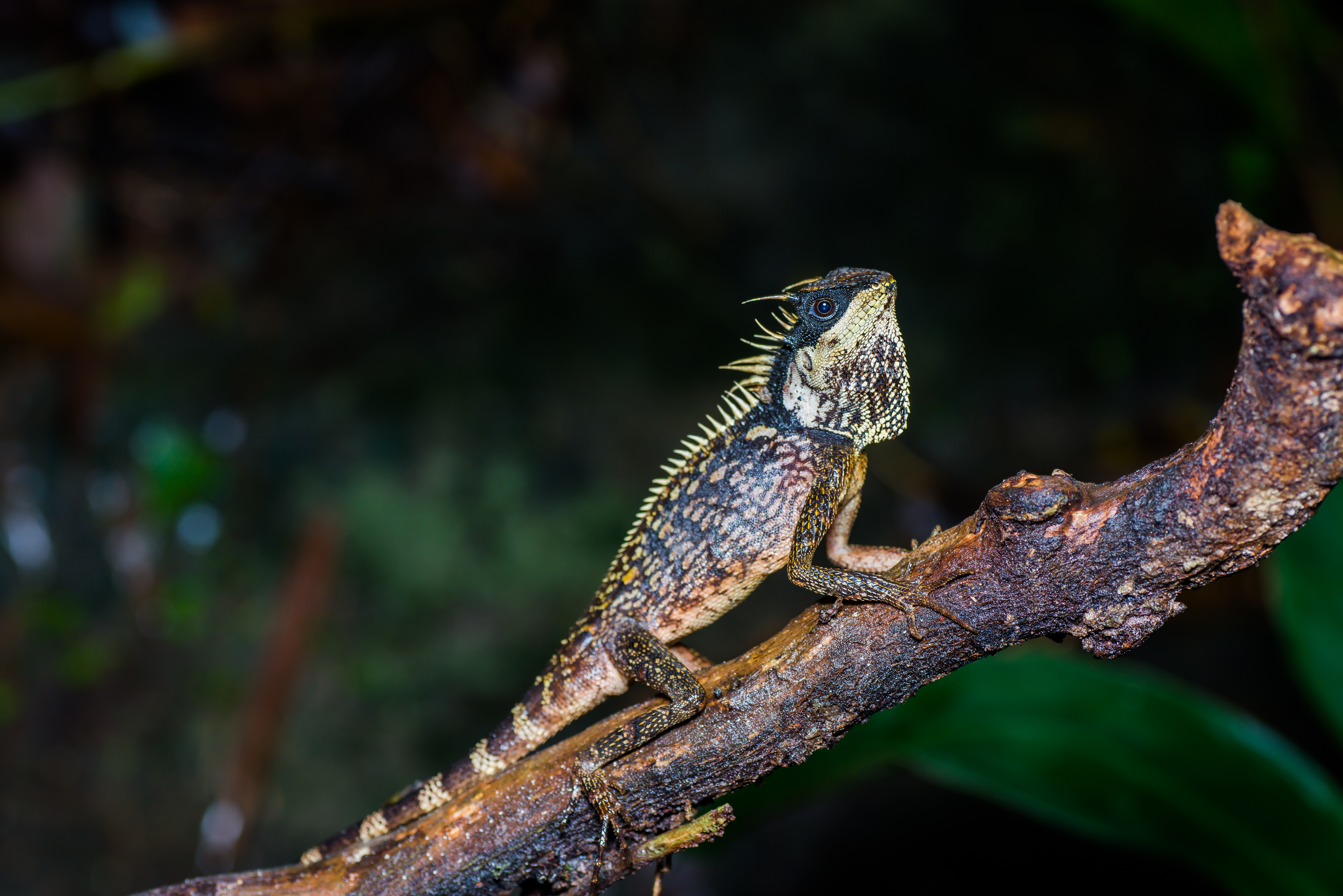
Acanthosaura phuketensis

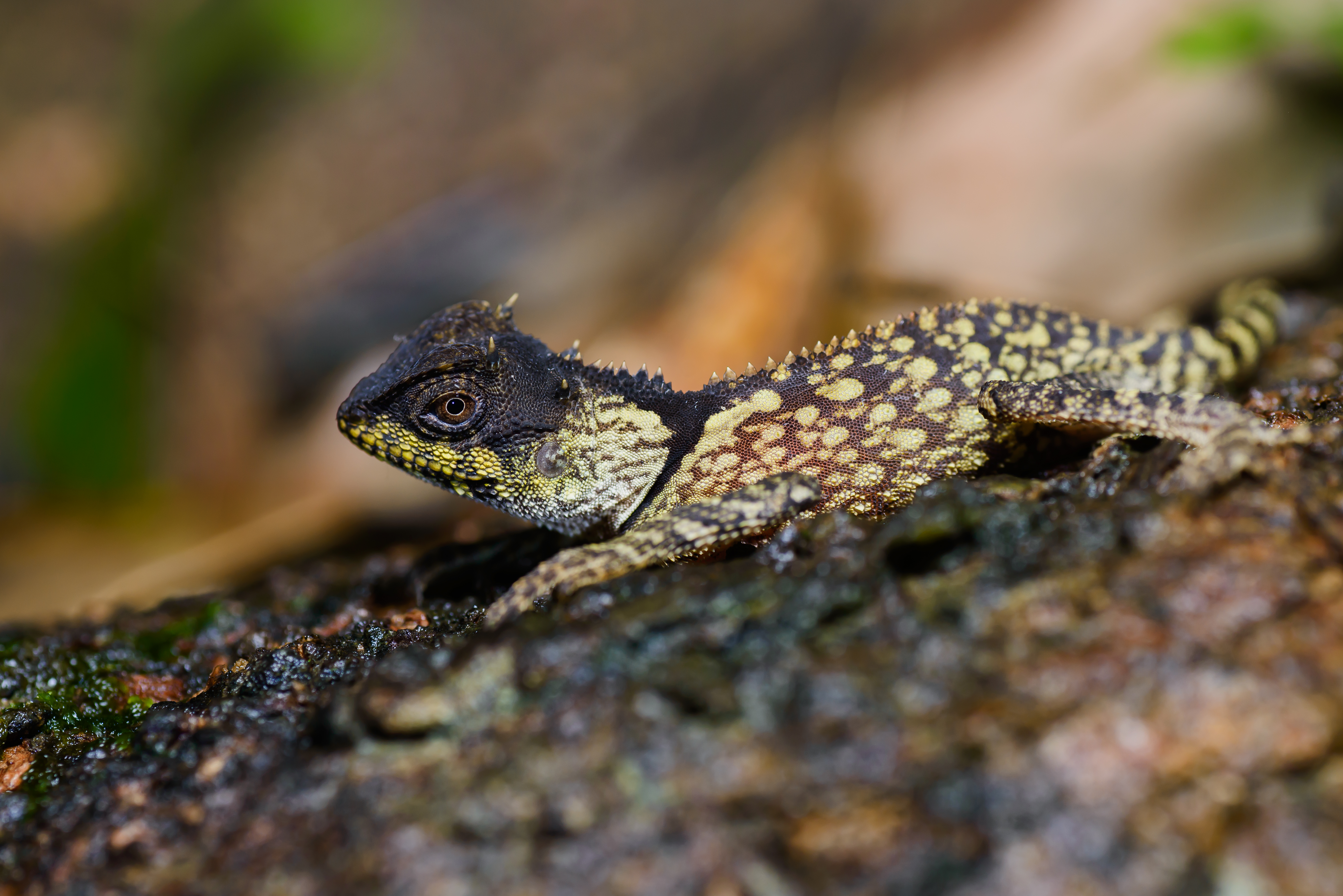
Acanthosaura phuketensis (juvenile)
