= Acanthosaura longicaudata =

Scientific classification
- Kingdom: Animalia
- Phylum: Chordata
- Class: Reptilia
- Order: Squamata
- Suborder: Iguania
- Family: Agamidae
- Genus: Acanthosaura
- Species: A. longicaudata

Binomial name
- Acanthosaura longicaudata Liu, Rao, Hou, Orlov, Ananjeva, & Zhang, 2022

Species of lizard

Acanthosaura longicaudata, the long-tailed horned tree lizard or long-tailed horned agamid, is a species of agama found in China.
