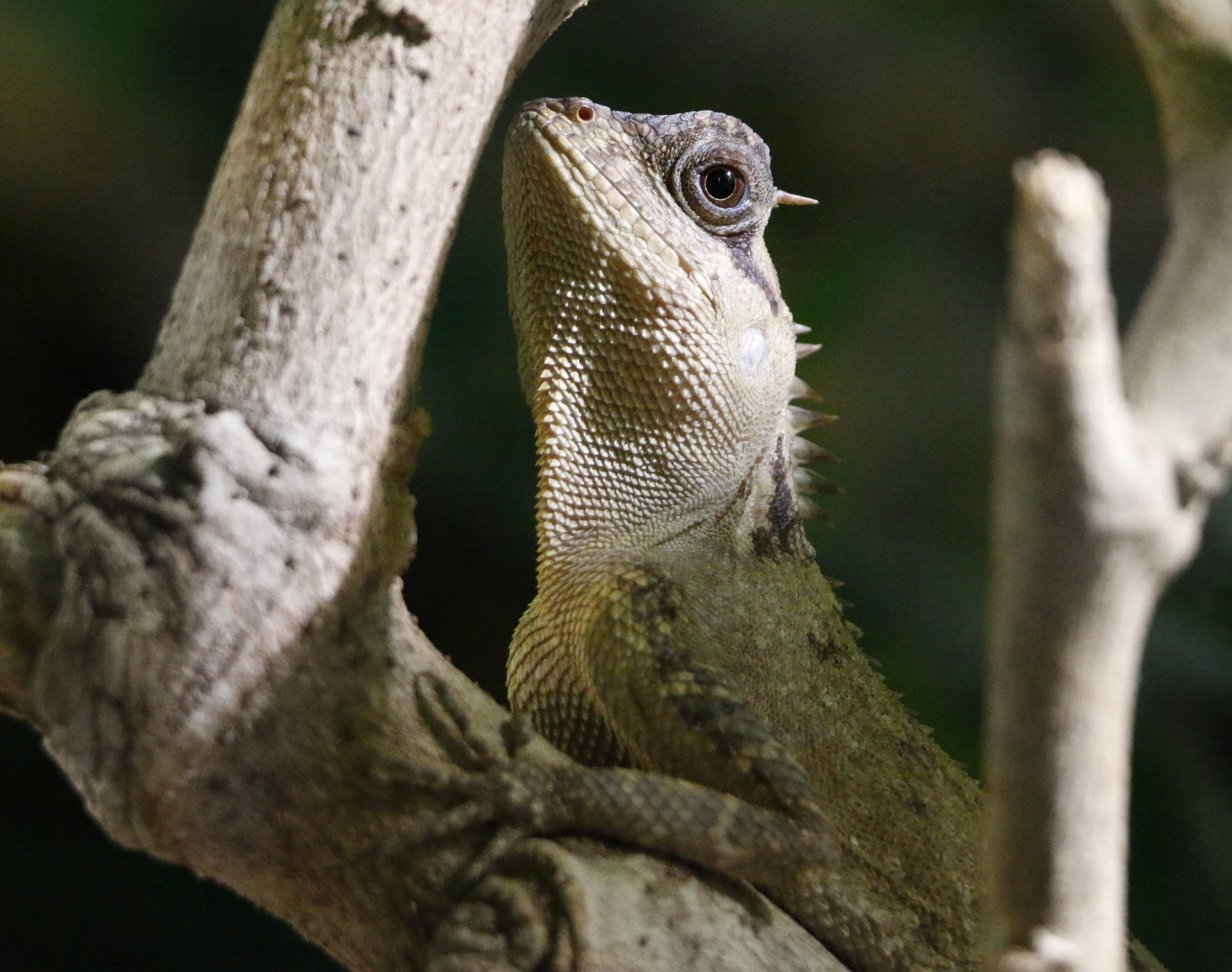

Scientific classification
- Kingdom: Animalia
- Phylum: Chordata
- Class: Reptilia
- Order: Squamata
- Suborder: Iguania
- Family: Agamidae
- Genus: Acanthosaura
- Species: A. murphyi

Binomial name
- Acanthosaura murphyi Nguyen, Do, Hoang, Nguyen, McCormack, Nguyen, Orlov, Nguyen, & Nguyen, 2018

= Acanthosaura murphyi =

Species of lizard

Acanthosaura murphyi (Vietnamese: Nhông xanh cao nguyên or Nhông Murphy)is a species of agama found in Vietnam.

It is an olive-coloured, brown to dark grey-coloured lizard with a body length of 10-13 cm and a tail length of 16-20 cm. It weighs up to 100 g. Like other agamas, thorn lizards can change colour according to mood or need.

Individuals of this species were originally thought to be individuals of mountain horned dragon (Acanthosaura capra). As a new species, it was only differentiated from it in 2018.
