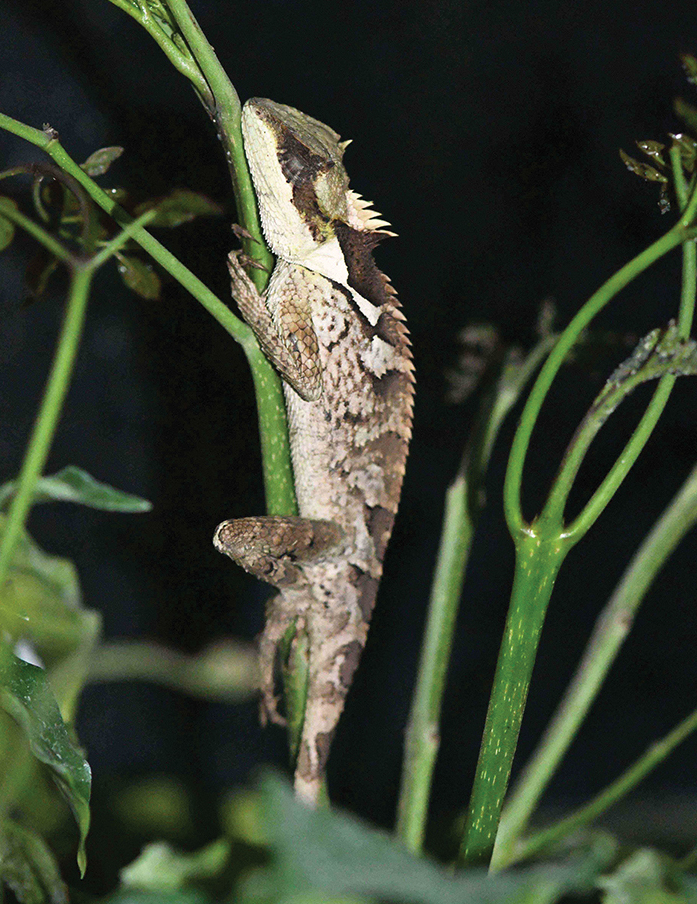

Scientific classification
- Kingdom: Animalia
- Phylum: Chordata
- Class: Reptilia
- Order: Squamata
- Suborder: Iguania
- Family: Agamidae
- Genus: Acanthosaura
- Species: A. liui

Binomial name
- Acanthosaura liui Liu, Hou, Mo, & Rao, 2020

= Acanthosaura liui =

Species of lizard

Acanthosaura liui is a species of agama found in China.
