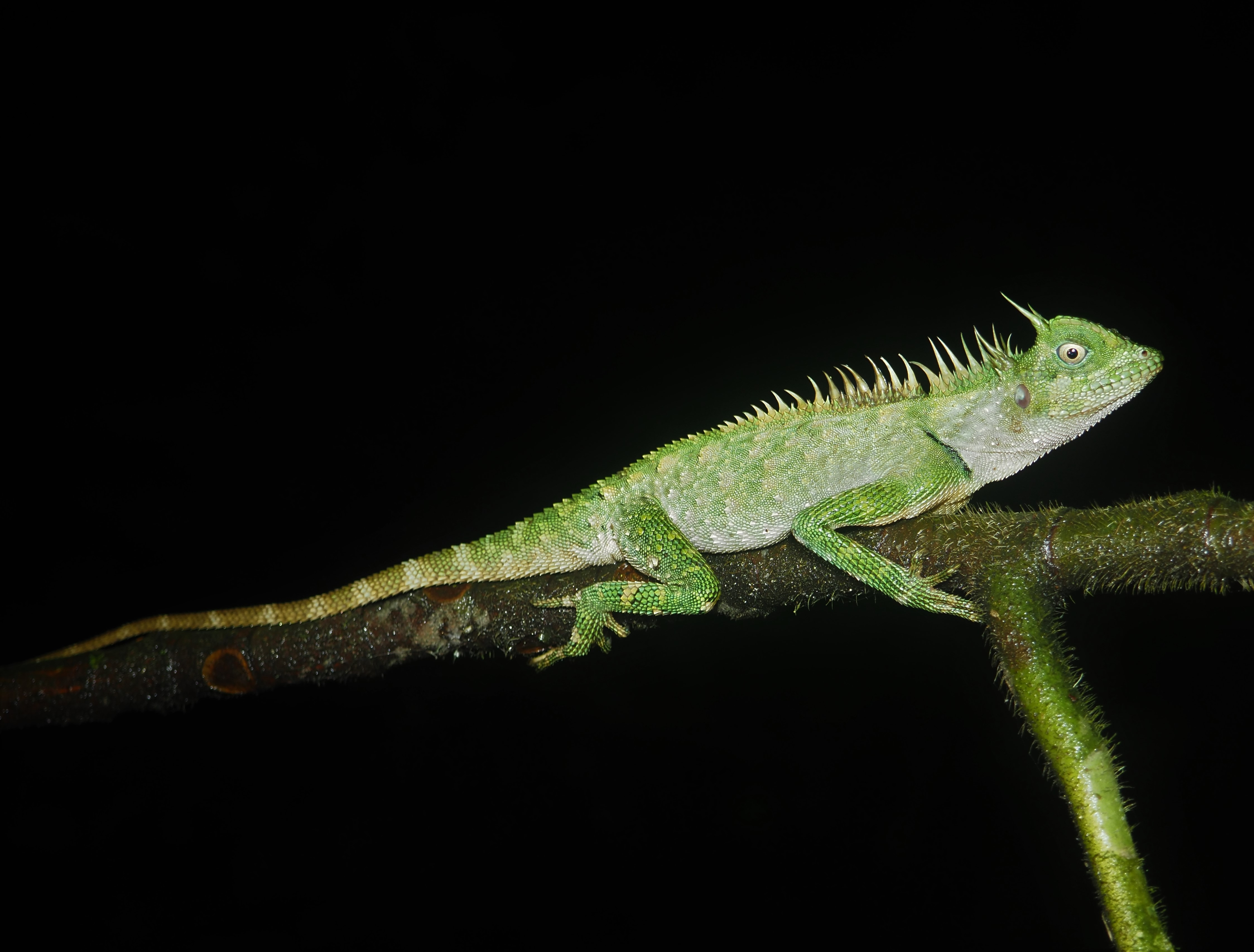

Scientific classification
- Kingdom: Animalia
- Phylum: Chordata
- Class: Reptilia
- Order: Squamata
- Suborder: Iguania
- Family: Agamidae
- Genus: Acanthosaura
- Species: A. armata

Binomial name
- Acanthosaura armata Gray, 1827

Synonyms
- Agama armata - Gray in Hardwicke 1827 (non Agama armata W. Peters 1854); Lophyurus armatus - A.M.C. Duméril & Bibron 1837: 413; Gonyocephalus (Acanthosaurus) armatus - Fitzinger 1843; Acanthosaura armata - Gray 1845; Acanthosaura armata - Günther 1864; Acanthosaura armata - Boulenger 1885: 301; Acanthosaura armata - De Rooij 1915: 125; Goniocephalus armatus armatus - M.A. Smith 1935: 158; Acanthosaura armata - Taylor 1963: 866; Goniocephalus armatus - Hendrickson 1966: 64; Acanthosaura armata - Wermuth 1967: 1; Acanthosaura armata - Manthey & Grossmann 1997: 154; Acanthosaura armata - Cox et al. 1998: 92; Acanthosaura armata - Manthey & Schuster 1999: 17; Acanthosaura armata - Grismer 2011

= Acanthosaura armata =

Species of lizard

Acanthosaura armata is a species of agamid lizard commonly known as the armored pricklenape or peninsular horned tree lizard. A. armata can be found in China (Hainan), Myanmar, Thailand, Peninsular Malaysia, Singapore, and Indonesia (Sumatra).
