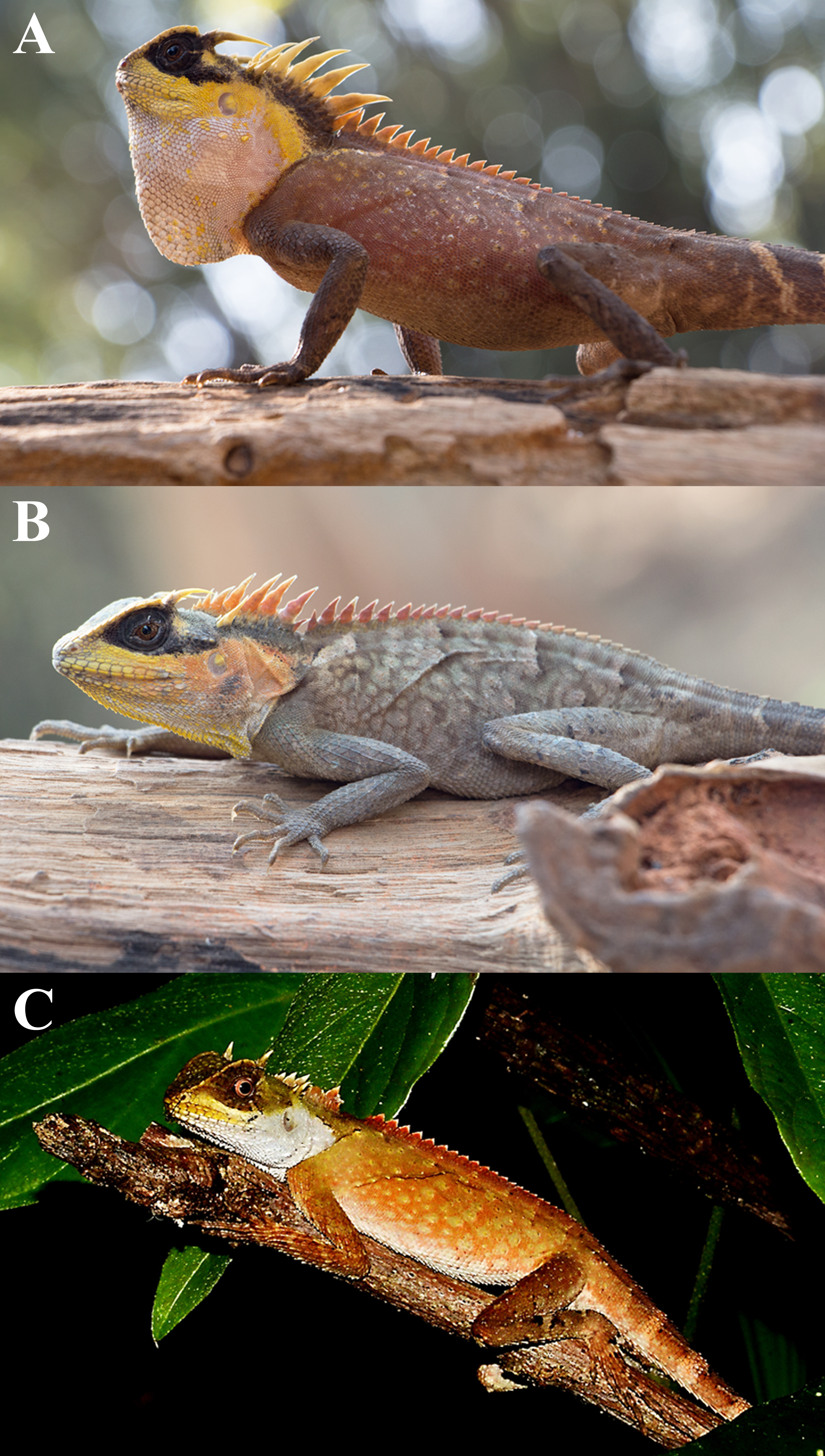
- A. Adult male paratype; B. Adult female paratype; and C. Subadult male paratype

Scientific classification
- Kingdom: Animalia
- Phylum: Chordata
- Class: Reptilia
- Order: Squamata
- Suborder: Iguania
- Family: Agamidae
- Genus: Acanthosaura
- Species: A. aurantiacrista

Binomial name
- Acanthosaura aurantiacrista Trivalairat, Kunya, Chanhome, Sumontha, Vasaruchapong, Chomngam, & Chiangkul, 2020

= Acanthosaura aurantiacrista =

Species of lizard

Acanthosaura aurantiacrista is a species of agama found in Northern Thailand.

Acanthosaura aurantiacrista have dagger-like nuchal spine with bright yellow coloruation in males and orange-yellowish colouration in females.

== Ecology ==
Acanthosaura aurantiacrista reside in Northern Thailand's evergreen forests on hills up to at least 600m elevation.
