= Acanthosaura rubrilabris =

Scientific classification
- Kingdom: Animalia
- Phylum: Chordata
- Class: Reptilia
- Order: Squamata
- Suborder: Iguania
- Family: Agamidae
- Genus: Acanthosaura
- Species: A. rubrilabris

Binomial name
- Acanthosaura rubrilabris Liu, Rao, Hou, Orlov, Ananjeva, & Zhang, 2022

Species of lizard

Acanthosaura rubrilabris, the red-lipped horned tree lizard or red-lipped horned agamid, is a species of agama found in China.
