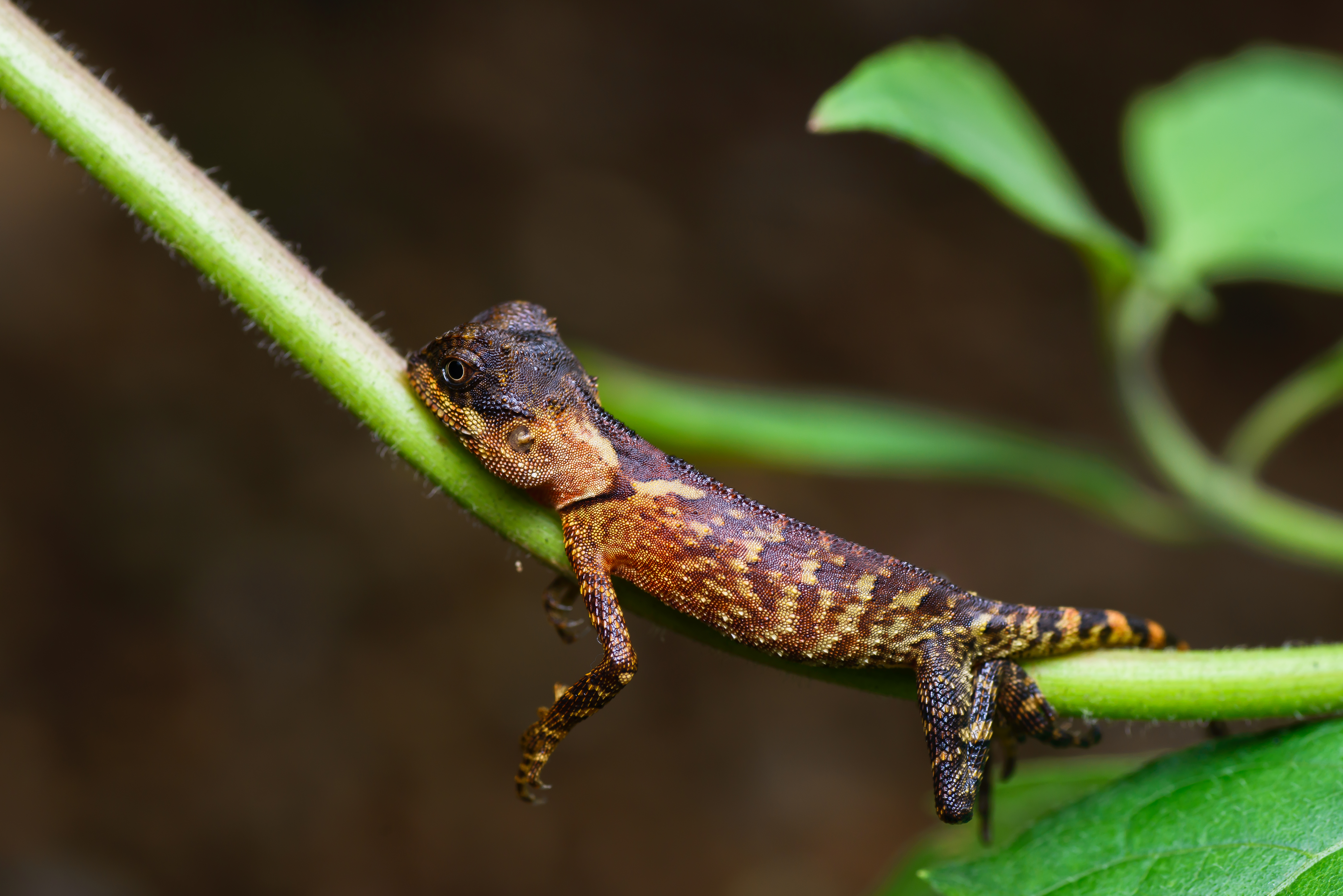
- Acanthosaura crucigera, Khao Luang National Park

Conservation status
- Least Concern (IUCN 3.1)

Scientific classification
- Kingdom: Animalia
- Phylum: Chordata
- Class: Reptilia
- Order: Squamata
- Suborder: Iguania
- Family: Agamidae
- Genus: Acanthosaura
- Species: A. crucigera

Binomial name
- Acanthosaura crucigera Boulenger, 1885

Synonyms
- Acanthosaura crucigera Boulenger 1885: 302; Acanthosaura horrescens Lönnberg 1916 (fide Smith 1935); Goniocephalus armatus crucigerus — Smith 1935: 160

= Acanthosaura crucigera =

Species of lizard

Acanthosaura crucigera (Thai: กิ้งก่าเขาหนามสั้น) is a species of lizard commonly known as the masked spiny lizard, Boulenger's pricklenape, or masked horned tree lizard. They are found in Myanmar, Thailand, Peninsular Malaysia, and Cambodia.

They have a distinct diamond-shaped black mark on the upper side of the neck and measure about 25 cm (9.8 in) in total, snout to tip of the tail.
