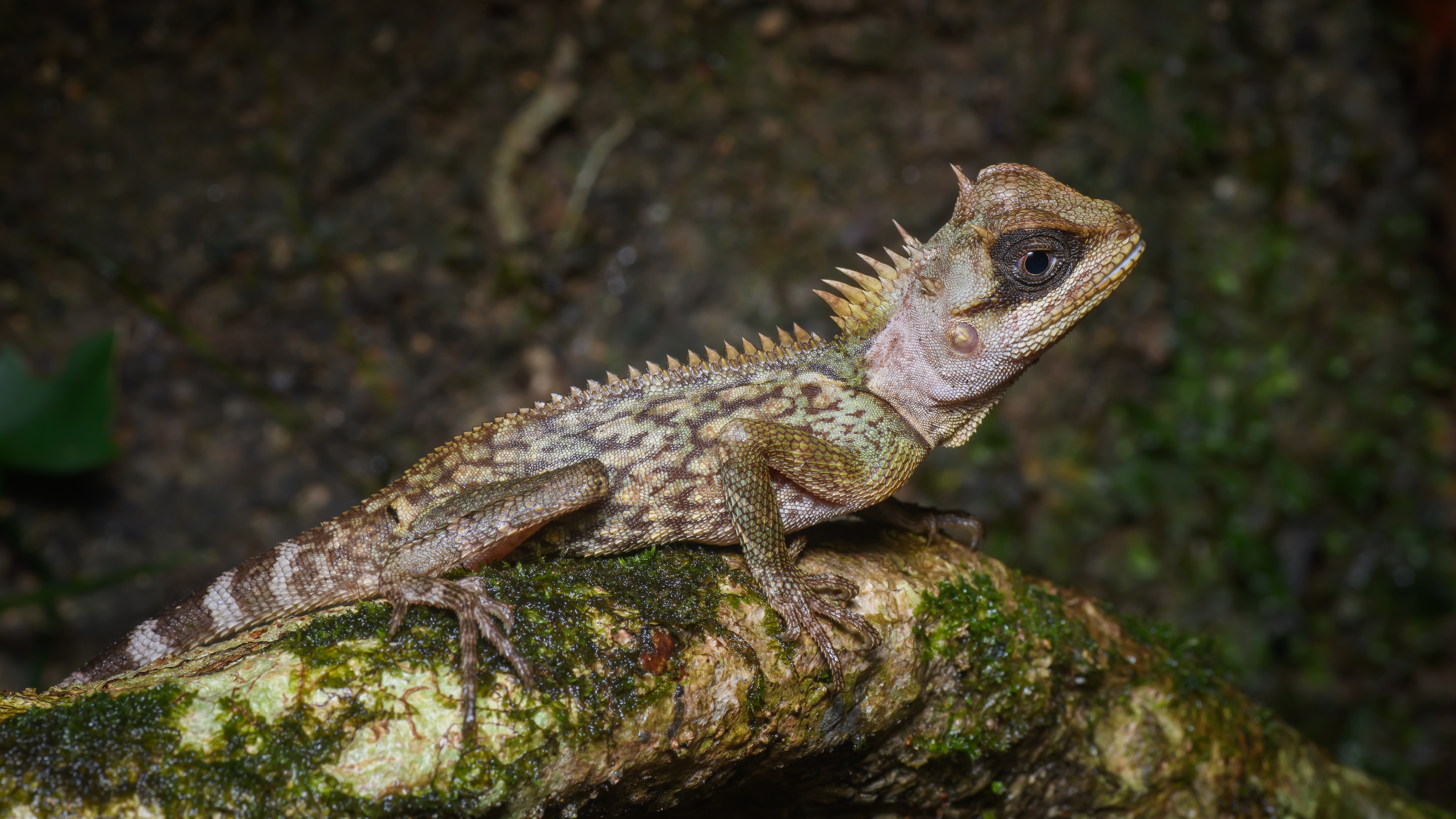

Conservation status
- Least Concern (IUCN 3.1)

Scientific classification
- Kingdom: Animalia
- Phylum: Chordata
- Class: Reptilia
- Order: Squamata
- Suborder: Iguania
- Family: Agamidae
- Genus: Acanthosaura
- Species: A. cardamomensis

Binomial name
- Acanthosaura cardamomensis Wood, Grismer, Neang, Chav, & Holden, 2010

Synonyms
- Acanthosaura cardamomensis WOOD, GRISMER, GRISMER, NEANG, CHAV & HOLDEN 2010; Acanthosaura armata Boulenger 1885: 301; Gonocephalus armatus crucigerus M.A. Smith 1935: 160–161; Acanthosaura crucigera Daltry & Chenag 2000: 100; Acanthosaura crucigera Daltry & Traeholt 2003: 99–100; Acanthosaura crucigera STUART & EMMETT 2006: 12–13; Acanthosaura cf. crucigera Grismer et al. 2007: 221–222; Acanthosaura sp. Grismer et al. 2008: 165

= Acanthosaura cardamomensis =

Species of lizard

Acanthosaura cardamomensis is a species of Agamid lizard found in eastern Thailand, western Cambodia and Vietnam. Its name derives from the Cardamom Mountains in eastern Thailand. It was first identified in 2010.
