= Acanthosaura bintangensis =

Conservation status
- Data Deficient (IUCN 3.1)

Scientific classification
- Kingdom: Animalia
- Phylum: Chordata
- Class: Reptilia
- Order: Squamata
- Suborder: Iguania
- Family: Agamidae
- Genus: Acanthosaura
- Species: A. bintangensis

Binomial name
- Acanthosaura bintangensis Wood, Grismer, Grismer, Ahmad, Onn, & Bauer, 2009

Species of lizard

Acanthosaura bintangensis, the Bukit Larut Mountain horned agamid or Bintang horned tree lizard, is a species of agama found in Malaysia.
