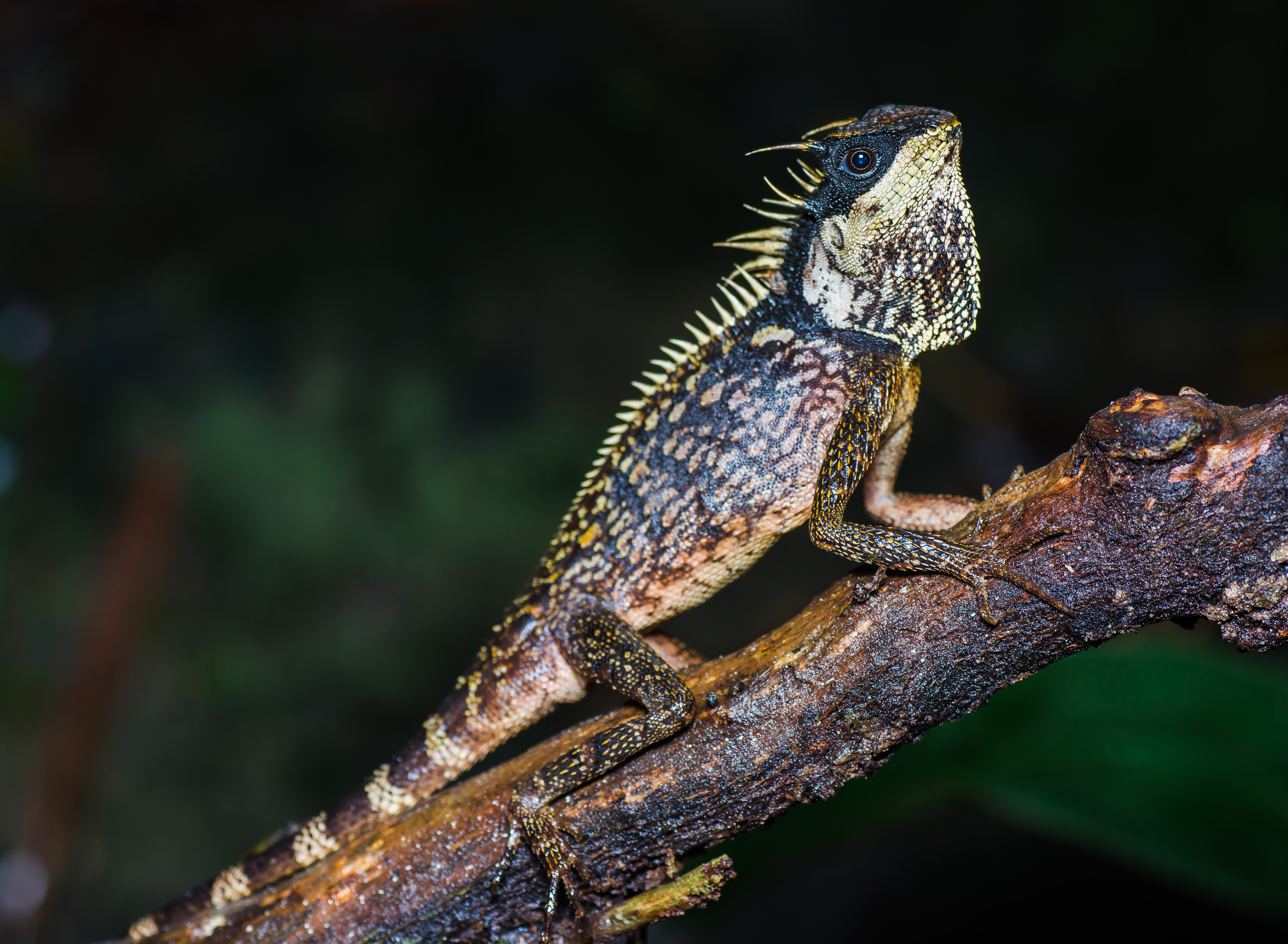

Conservation status
- Least Concern (IUCN 3.1)

Scientific classification
- Kingdom: Animalia
- Phylum: Chordata
- Class: Reptilia
- Order: Squamata
- Suborder: Iguania
- Family: Agamidae
- Genus: Acanthosaura
- Species: A. phuketensis

Binomial name
- Acanthosaura phuketensis Pauwels, Sumontha, Kunya, Nitikul, Samphanthamit, Wood & Grismer, 2015

= Acanthosaura phuketensis =

Species of lizard

Acanthosaura phuketensis, the Phuket horned dragon, is a species of arboreal lizard native to Phuket Province, Thailand. It was discovered in 2015. It is now the 11th species in the genus Acanthosaura.

== Description ==
Acanthosaura phuketensis is a medium-sized lizard ranging from 7.5 to 15 inches in length. It has horns running down from its head but stops at the beginning of its tail. It is a lowland forest-dwelling species.
