= Acanthosaura meridiona =

Scientific classification
- Kingdom: Animalia
- Phylum: Chordata
- Class: Reptilia
- Order: Squamata
- Suborder: Iguania
- Family: Agamidae
- Genus: Acanthosaura
- Species: A. meridiona

Binomial name
- Acanthosaura meridiona Trivalairat, Sumontha, Kunya, & Chiangkul, 2022

Species of lizard

Acanthosaura meridiona is a species of agama found in Thailand.
