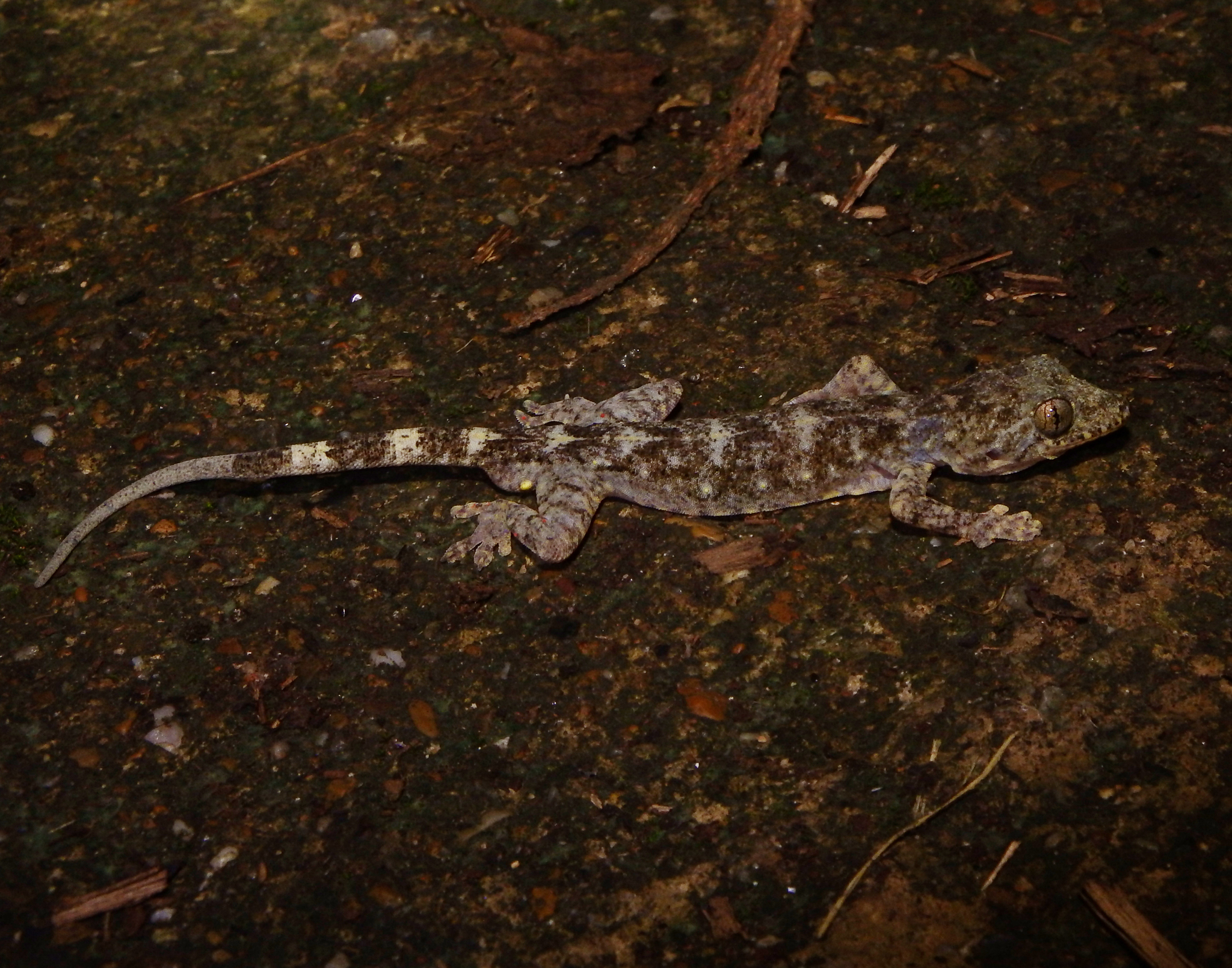

Conservation status
- Least Concern (IUCN 3.1)

Scientific classification
- Kingdom: Animalia
- Phylum: Chordata
- Class: Reptilia
- Order: Squamata
- Suborder: Gekkota
- Family: Gekkonidae
- Genus: Gekko
- Species: G. adleri

Binomial name
- Gekko adleri Nguyen, Wang, Yang, Lehmann, Le, Ziegler & Bonkowski, 2013

= Adler's gecko =

Species of lizard

Adler's gecko (Gekko adleri) is a species of lizard in the family Gekkonidae. The species is native to southern China and northern Vietnam.

== Etymology ==
The specific name, adleri, is in honor of American herpetologist Kraig Adler.

== Geographic range ==
G. adleri is found in Guangxi Zhuang Autonomous Region, China, and in Cao Bang Province, Vietnam.

== Description ==
G. adleri is moderate-sized for its genus. Adults do not exceed a snout-to-vent length (SVL) of 8 cm (3.1 in).

== Habitat ==
The preferred natural habitat of G. adleri is forest.
