= Acanthosaura phongdienensis =

Scientific classification
- Kingdom: Animalia
- Phylum: Chordata
- Class: Reptilia
- Order: Squamata
- Suborder: Iguania
- Family: Agamidae
- Genus: Acanthosaura
- Species: A. phongdienensis

Binomial name
- Acanthosaura phongdienensis Nguyen, Jin, Vo, Nguyen, Zhou, Che, Murphy, and Zhang, 2019

Species of lizard

Acanthosaura phongdienensis is a species of agamid lizard. It is endemic to central Vietnam. It is known only from Phong Dien Nature Reserve in the Huế. It is a medium-sized agamid lizard with a snout–vent length of 73–77 mm (2.9–3.0 in) in males and 59–65 mm (2.3–2.6 in) in females. The tail is longer than the body. Males have a green upperside and white underside, with black blotches along the side. The uppersides of the head and neck are black, as is a large region in front of the shoulder. The tips of the nuchal spines, postorbital spines, and nuchal crests are yellow-green. Females have brown uppersides and sides. They also have shorter spines and crests, relatively shorter tails, and are much smaller overall.

== Taxonomy ==
Acanthosaura phongdienensis was described by the herpetologist Sang Nguyen and colleagues in 2019 on the basis of an adult male specimen collected from Phong Ðiền Nature Reserve in Thua Thien-Hue Province, Vietnam. It is named after the Phong Ðiền Nature Reserve where it was first collected.

== Description ==
Acanthosaura phongdienensis is a medium-sized agamid lizard with a snout–vent length of 73–77 mm (2.9–3.0 in) in males and 59–65 mm (2.3–2.6 in) in females. The tail is longer than the SVL. The tympanum is naked and the nuchal and dorsal crests are continuous. The nuchal spine is located midway between the nuchal crest and tympanum. The rostral scute is entire. The lateral scales are small and interlaced with large, keeled scales, keeled backward and back-upward.

Males have a green upperside and white underside, with black blotches along the side. The uppersides of the head and neck are black, as is a large region in front of the shoulder. This black area narrows towards the neck and then widens towards the back, making a diamond shape when viewed from above. The tips of the nuchal spines, postorbital spines, and nuchal crests are yellow-green. The elbows and knees have white markings. The tail is dark brown with whitish or light brown rings. The iris is brown. Females have brown uppersides and sides. They also have shorter spines and crests, relatively shorter tails, and are much smaller overall.

== Distribution and habitat ==
The species is currently only known from Phong Ðiền Nature Reserve in Vietnam. The type specimens were collected at night on trees and near small streams in evergreen forest at elevations of 165–1,019 m (541–3,343 ft).
