= Acanthosaura brachypoda =

Conservation status
- Data Deficient (IUCN 3.1)

Scientific classification
- Kingdom: Animalia
- Phylum: Chordata
- Class: Reptilia
- Order: Squamata
- Suborder: Iguania
- Family: Agamidae
- Genus: Acanthosaura
- Species: A. brachypoda

Binomial name
- Acanthosaura brachypoda Ananjeva, Orlov, Nguyen, & Ryabov, 2011

Species of lizard

Acanthosaura brachypoda is a species of agama found in Vietnam.
