= Van Sang Nguyen =

Vietnamese biologist and herpetologist

Nguyễn Văn Sáng
- Citizenship: Vietnam
- Known for: Research on reptiles and amphibians of Vietnam
- Scientific career
- Fields: Herpetology
- Institutions: Institute of Ecology and Biological Resources

Nguyễn Văn Sáng is a Vietnamese biologist and herpetologist who worked at the Institute of Ecology and Biological Resources. He specializes in the study of reptiles and amphibians.

Nguyễn Văn Sáng is honored in the scientific name of the snake Coluberoelaps nguyenvansangi, described in 2009, after he collected the type specimen of the species. The species is commonly known in Vietnamese as Rắn Nguyễn Văn Sáng. He is also a co-author in the description of several reptile species, including the lizards Dopasia sokolovi, Scincella rufocaudatus, Sphenomorphus buenloicus and Acanthosaura nataliae, among others.
