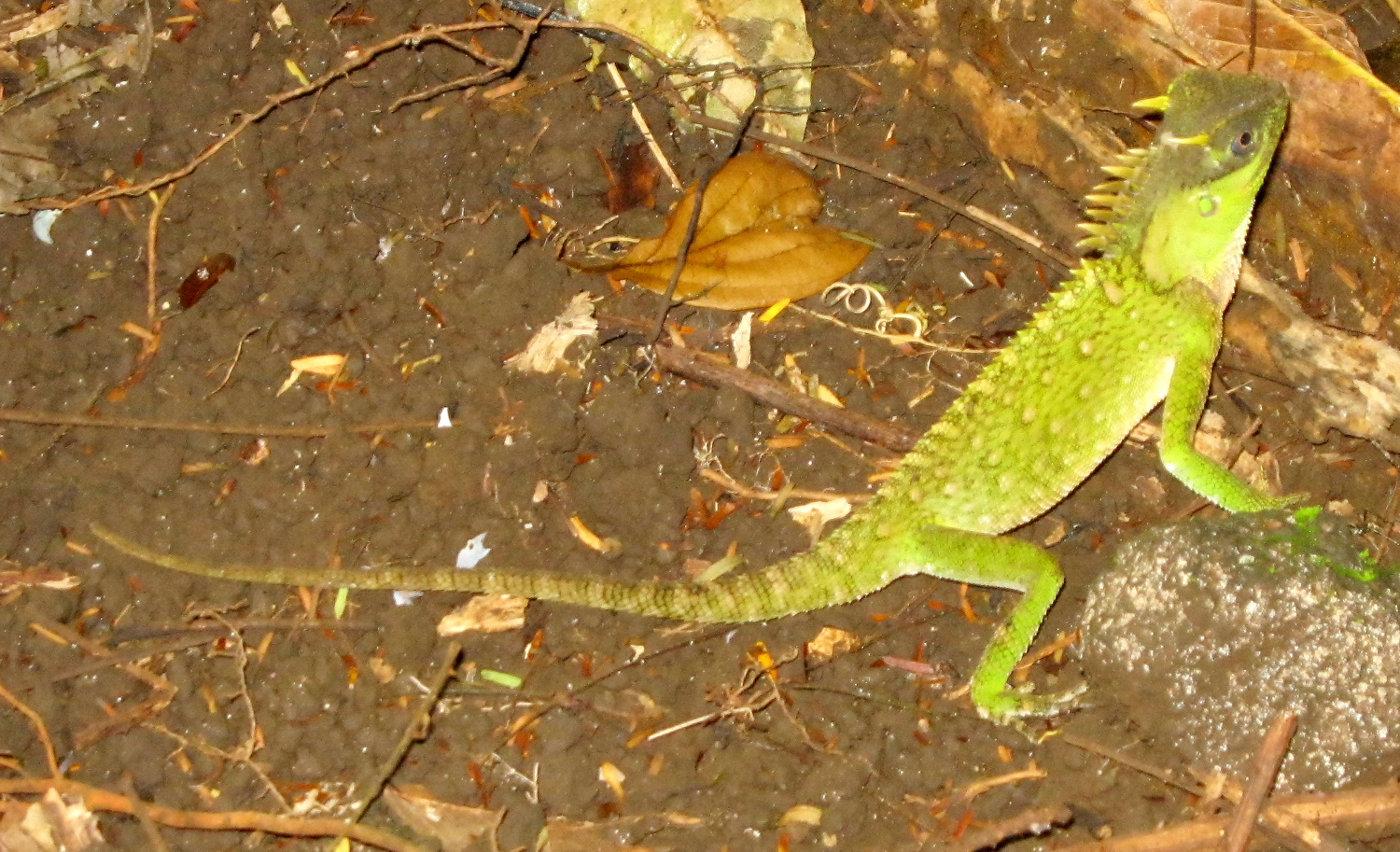
- Acanthosaura capra, Cat Tien National Park

Conservation status
- Near Threatened (IUCN 3.1)

Scientific classification
- Kingdom: Animalia
- Phylum: Chordata
- Class: Reptilia
- Order: Squamata
- Suborder: Iguania
- Family: Agamidae
- Genus: Acanthosaura
- Species: A. capra

Binomial name
- Acanthosaura capra Günther, 1861

= Acanthosaura capra =

Species of lizard

Acanthosaura capra is a species of Agamid lizards: commonly known as the mountain horned dragon, it is also called the Indo-Chinese spiny lizard or the green pricklenape.

== Distribution and description ==
A. capra can be found in the tropical forests of Cambodia (Mondolkiri) and southern Vietnam (Dong Nai, Khánh Hòa and Lâm Đồng provinces); reports of their presence in Laos are probably inaccurate. They are diurnal and mostly arboreal and can be found in Cát Tiên National Park, where they can be distinguished from the commonly encountered A. coronata by their considerably more pronounced dorsal spines and nuchal crest. Sexual dimorphism is not pronounced, with males having a slimmer and slightly tapered body than the females, which are broader-bodied.
