= Acanthosaura prasina =

Scientific classification
- Kingdom: Animalia
- Phylum: Chordata
- Class: Reptilia
- Order: Squamata
- Suborder: Iguania
- Family: Agamidae
- Genus: Acanthosaura
- Species: A. prasina

Binomial name
- Acanthosaura prasina Ananjeva, Ermakov, Nguyen, Nguyen, Murphy, Lukonina, & Orlov, 2020

Species of lizard

Acanthosaura prasina is a species of agama found in Vietnam.
