= Ba Na dwarf gecko =

Scientific classification
- Kingdom: Animalia
- Phylum: Chordata
- Class: Reptilia
- Order: Squamata
- Suborder: Gekkota
- Family: Gekkonidae
- Genus: Hemiphyllodactylus
- Species: H. banaensis

Binomial name
- Hemiphyllodactylus banaensis Tri, Grismer, Thai, & Wood, 2014

Species of lizard

The Ba Na dwarf gecko (Hemiphyllodactylus banaensis) is a species of gecko. It is endemic to Vietnam.
