= Acanthosaura nataliae =

Conservation status
- Least Concern (IUCN 3.1)

Scientific classification
- Kingdom: Animalia
- Phylum: Chordata
- Class: Reptilia
- Order: Squamata
- Suborder: Iguania
- Family: Agamidae
- Genus: Acanthosaura
- Species: A. nataliae

Binomial name
- Acanthosaura nataliae Orlov, T.Q. Nguyen & V.S. Nguyen, 2006

Species of lizard

Acanthosaura nataliae is a species of lizard in the subfamily Draconinae of the family Agamidae.

== Etymology ==
The specific name, nataliae, is in honor of Russian herpetologist Natalia Borisovna Ananjeva.

== Geographic distribution ==
Acanthosaura nataliae is found in Cambodia, Laos, and Vietnam.

== Habitat ==
The preferred natural habitat of Acanthosaura nataliae is forest, at elevations of 350–1,400 m (1,150–4,590 ft).

== Behavior ==
Acanthosaura nataliae is arboreal and diurnal.

== Reproduction ==
Acanthosaura nataliae is oviparous. Clutch size is as many as 16 eggs.
