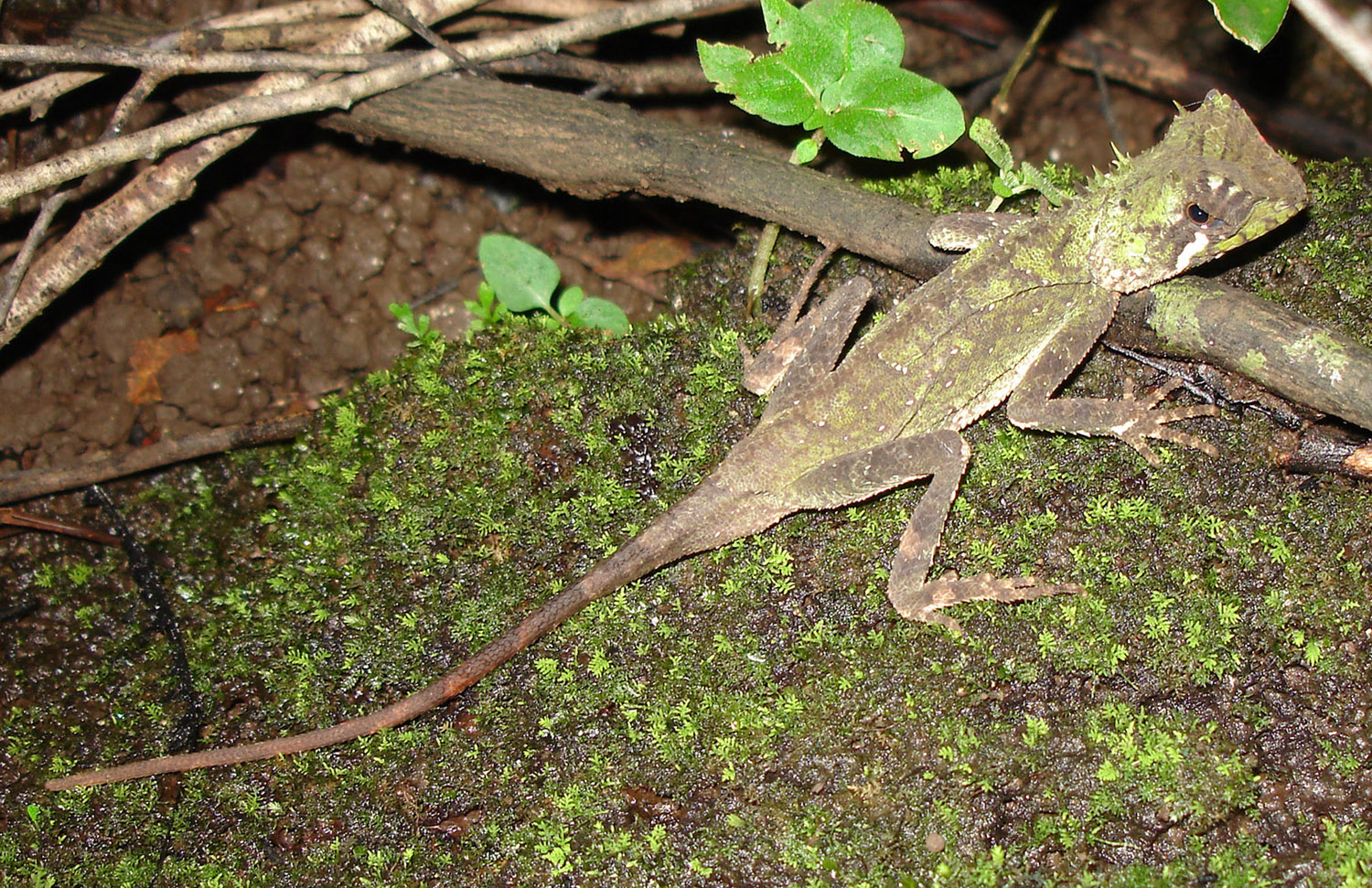
- Male, Cat Tien National Park
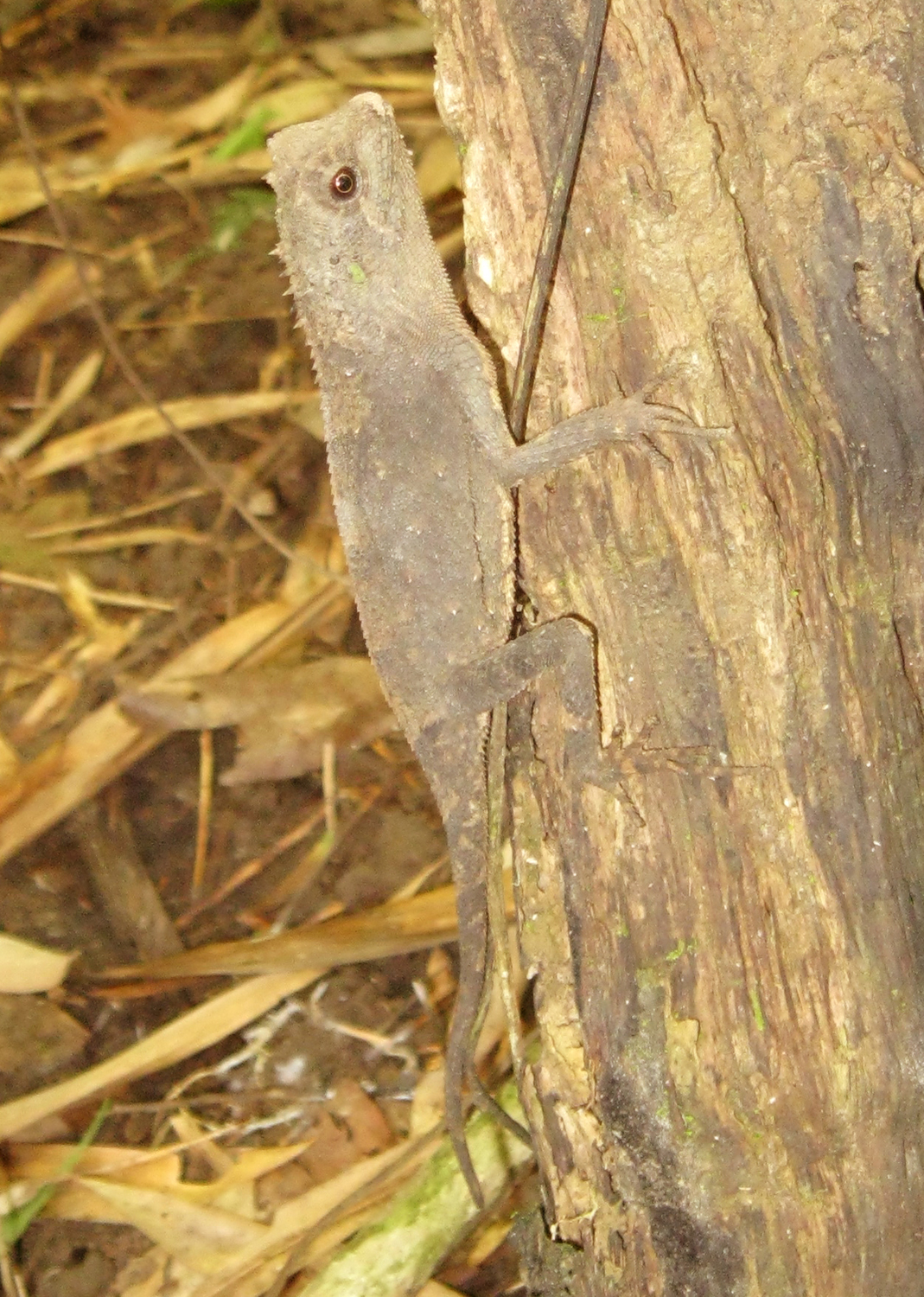
- Female, Cat Tien National Park

Conservation status
- Least Concern (IUCN 3.1)

Scientific classification
- Kingdom: Animalia
- Phylum: Chordata
- Class: Reptilia
- Order: Squamata
- Suborder: Iguania
- Family: Agamidae
- Genus: Acanthosaura
- Species: A. coronata

Binomial name
- Acanthosaura coronata Günther, 1861

= Acanthosaura coronata =

Species of reptile

Acanthosaura coronata is a species of agamid lizard commonly known as the crowned spiny lizard. They are found in the lowland tropical forests of eastern Cambodia (type location) and Vietnam (Lam Dong and Dong Nai provinces), where they are diurnal. Although often found near the ground, they have cryptic colouration and climb trees when threatened.
