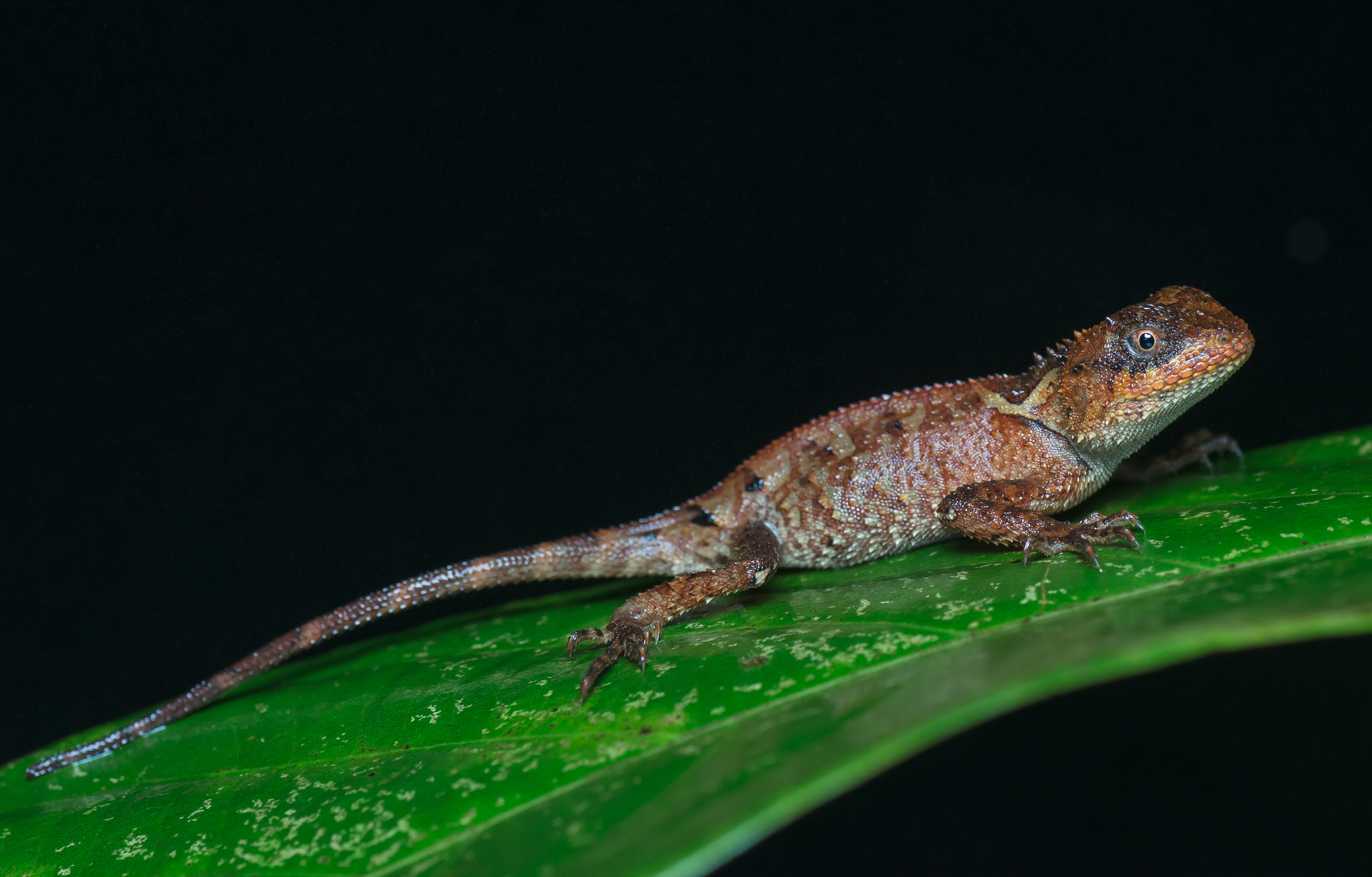

Conservation status
- Least Concern (IUCN 3.1)

Scientific classification
- Kingdom: Animalia
- Phylum: Chordata
- Class: Reptilia
- Order: Squamata
- Suborder: Iguania
- Family: Agamidae
- Genus: Acanthosaura
- Species: A. lepidogaster

Binomial name
- Acanthosaura lepidogaster Cuvier, 1829
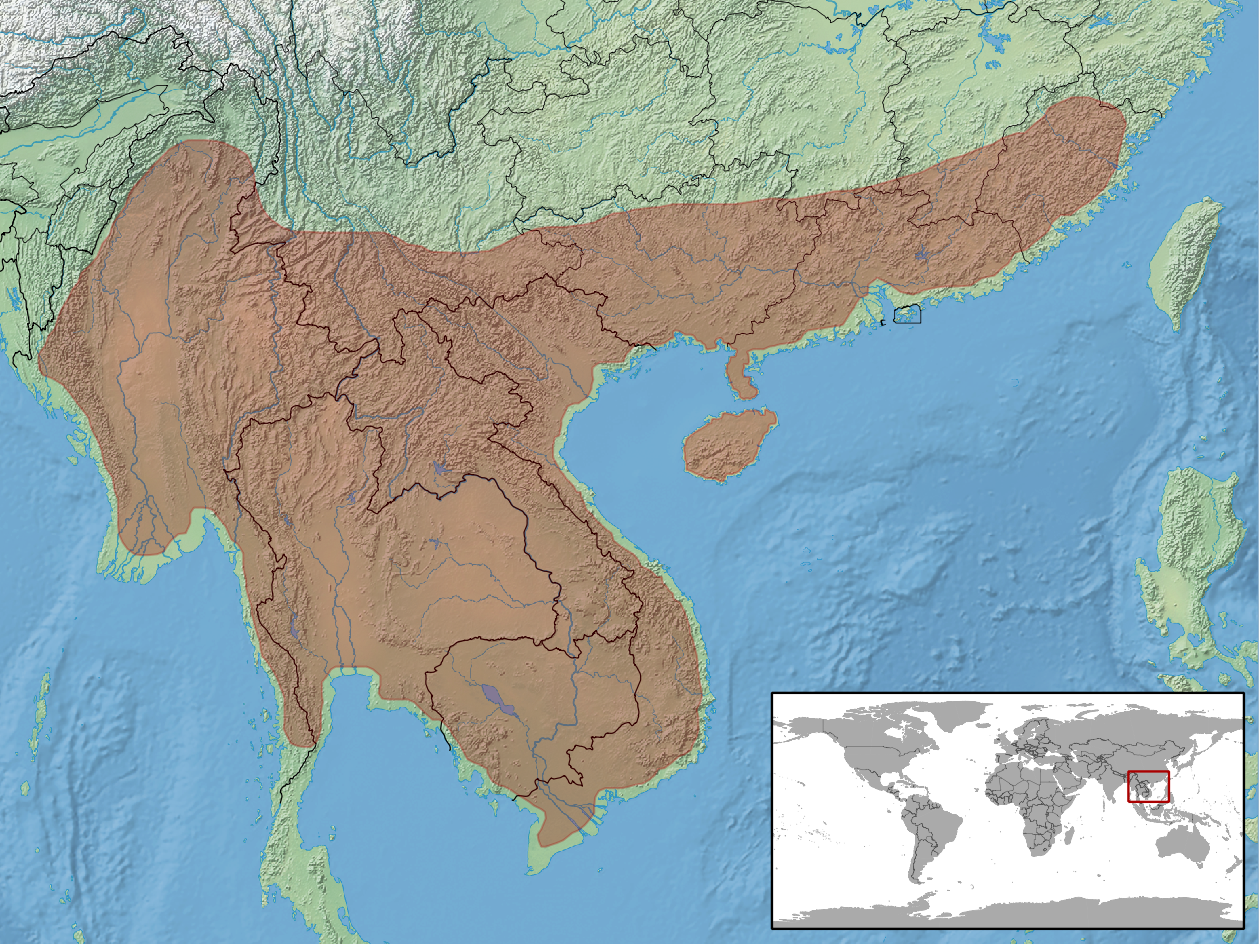
- Distribution range of Acanthosaura lepidogaster

Synonyms
- Calotes lepidogaster CUVIER 1829; Lophyrus tropidogaster DUMÉRIL & BIBRON 1837; Acanthosaura lamnidentata Boulenger 1885; Acanthosaura hainanensis Boulenger 1900; Acanthosaura fruhstorferi WERNER 1904; Acanthosaura braueri VOGT 1914; Goniocephalus lepidogaster SMITH 1935; Calotes fruhstorferi SMITH 1935; Calotes fruhstorferi BOURRET 1943; Gonocephalus lepidogaster MELL 1952; Calotes brevipes MERTENS 1954; Acanthosaura lepidogaster TAYLOR 1963; Calotes brevipes WERMUTH 1967; Calotes breviceps TIEDEMANN & HÄUPL 1980; Acanthosaura lepidogaster BRYGOO 1988; Calotes brevipes ZHAO & ADLER 1993: 1992; Acanthosaura fruhstorferi DENZER et al. 1997; Acanthosaura lepidogaster SCHLÜTER & HALLERMANN 1997; Acanthosaura lepidogaster COX et al. 1998; Acanthosaura lepidogaster CHAN-ARD et al. 1999; Acanthosaura lepidogaster MANTHEY & SCHUSTER 1999; Acanthosaura lepidogastra MACEY et al. 2000; Acanthosaura lepidogaster BARTS & WILMS 2003; Acanthosaura lepidogaster BOBROV & SEMENOV 2008

= Acanthosaura lepidogaster =

Brown pricklenape

Species of lizard

Acanthosaura lepidogaster, commonly known as the brown pricklenape, is a species of agamid lizard found in Thailand, Vietnam, Myanmar, Laos and China.
