= Serrated polyposis syndrome =

- Other names: Hyperplastic polyposis syndrome (former)
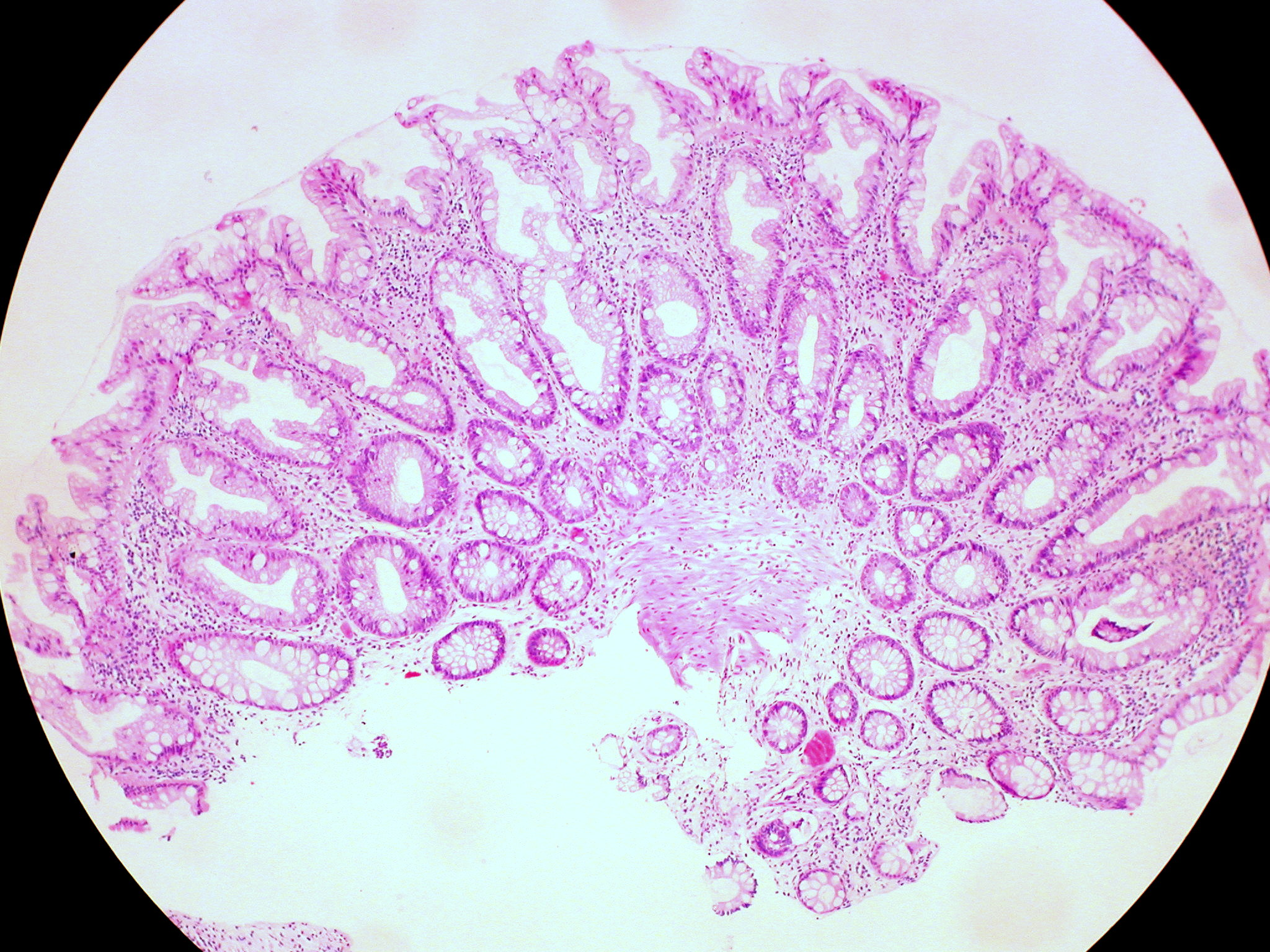
- Hyperplastic polyp seen under microscopy with H&E stain
- Specialty: Gastroenterology
- Symptoms: Asymptomatic
- Complications: Colorectal cancer (~20%)
- Usual onset: 55 years of age (average)
- Types: Distal and proximal
- Causes: Environmental and genetic factors
- Risk factors: Smoking, Lymphoma
- Diagnostic method: Colonoscopy
- Treatment: Surveillance colonoscopy Polypectomy; Surgery
- Frequency: 0.03–0.5%.

Serrated polyposis syndrome (SPS), previously known as hyperplastic polyposis syndrome, is a disorder characterized by the appearance of serrated polyps in the colon. While serrated polyposis syndrome does not cause symptoms, the condition is associated with a higher risk of colorectal cancer (CRC). The lifelong risk of CRC is between 25 and 40%. SPS is the most common polyposis syndrome affecting the colon, but is under recognized due to a lack of systemic long term monitoring. Diagnosis requires colonoscopy, and is defined by the presence of either of two criteria: five or more serrated lesions/polyps proximal to the rectum (all ≥ 5 mm in size, with two lesions ≥10 mm), or more than 20 serrated lesions/polyps of any size distributed throughout the colon with five proximal to the rectum.

A family history of SPS and smoking tobacco are associated with a higher risk of serrated polyposis syndrome, whereas the use of aspirin and nonsteroidal anti-inflammatory drugs (NSAIDs) are associated with a lower risk. While the only validated genetic cause of SPS is mutations in RNF43, additional important genetic abnormalities include BRAF mutations, abnormal CpG island methylator phenotype, and microsatellite instability. However, most individuals with the syndrome do not have an associated germline mutation. The types of polyps found in SPS include sessile serrated adenomas/polyps, traditional serrated adenomas, and hyperplastic polyps. SPS occurs in two phenotypes: proximal and distal. Proximal SPS has a greater risk of CRC than distal SPS.

The vast majority of cases may be managed with colonoscopy with removal polyps (polypectomy). Polyp removal is recommended to decrease the risk of colorectal cancer. Repeat colonoscopy should be performed every one to three years. If polyps are very large, numerous, or increase in number rapidly, then surgery may be necessary. Surgery may also be warranted if CRC is suspected or confirmed. First-degree relatives of people with SPS have an increased risk of CRC, and should undergo early screening with colonoscopy.

== Types ==
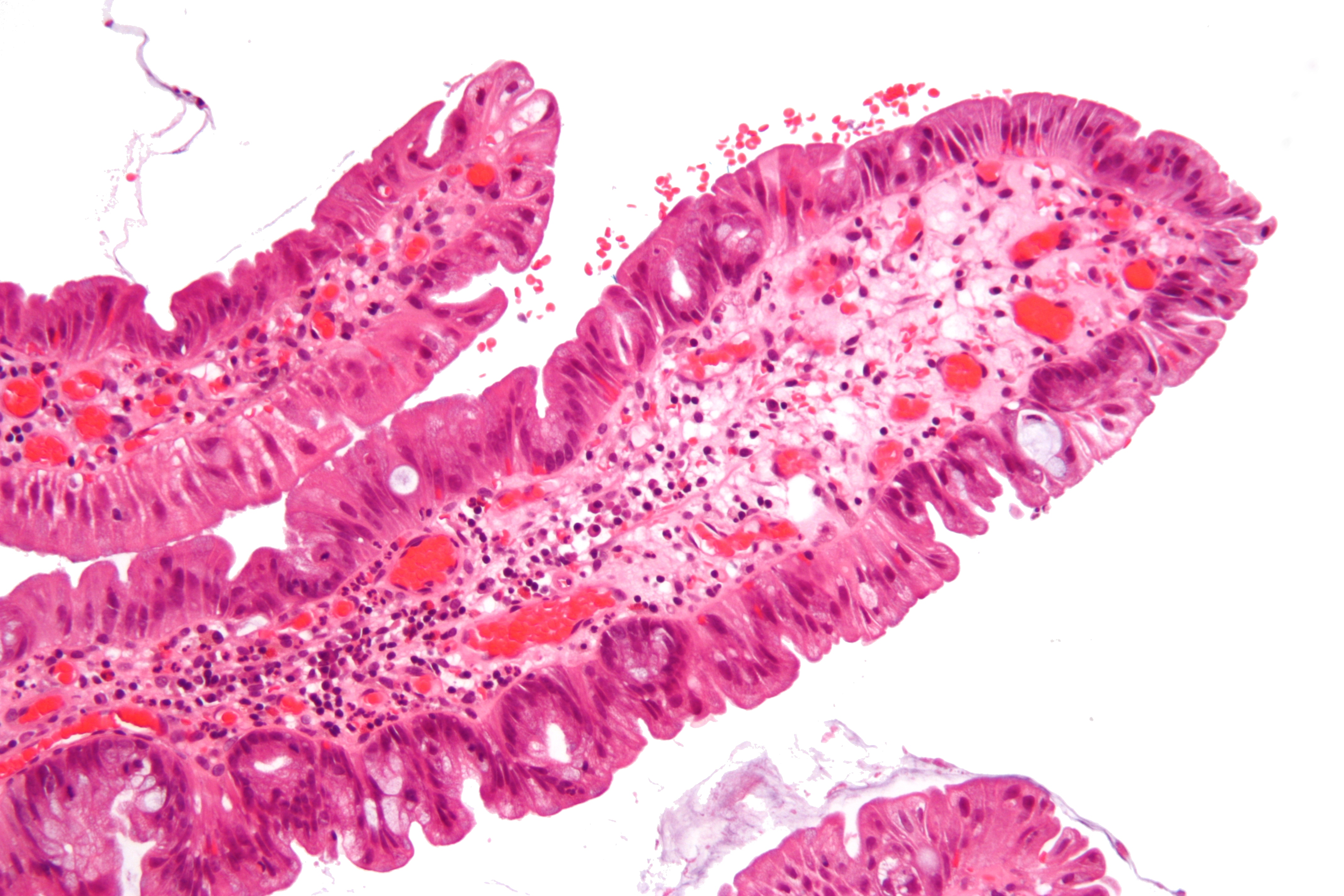
Traditional serrated adenoma seen under microscopy with H&E stain, showing serrated crypts

SPS may occur with one of two phenotypes: distal or proximal. The distal phenotype may demonstrate numerous small polyps in the distal colon (sigmoid) and rectum, whereas the proximal phenotype may be characterized by relatively fewer, but larger polyps in the proximal colon (cecum, ascending colon, etc.). Individuals meeting only criterion 3 from 2010 criteria, or only criterion 2 from the 2019 classification, have a distal phenotype have a lower risk of CRC compared with the proximal phenotype.

== Signs and symptoms ==
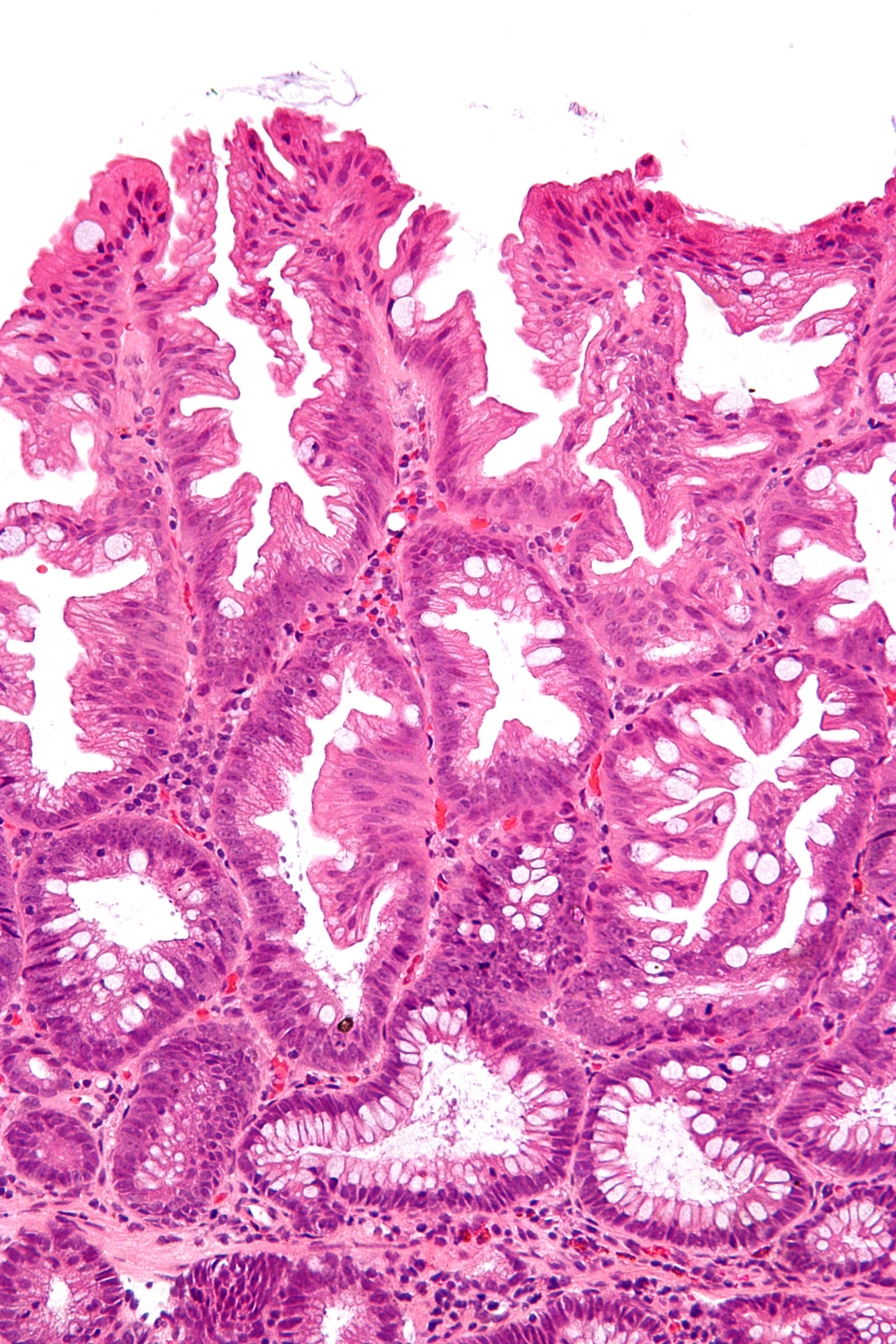
Sessile serrated adenoma seen under microscopy with H&E stain

Serrated polyposis syndrome often does not cause symptoms. The risk of colon cancer is between 25 and 40%.

Sessile serrated polyps, as seen during endoscopy or colonoscopy, are flat (rather than raised) and are easily overlooked. Serrated lesions range in size from small (<5 mm) to large, and often have a "mucous cap" overlying the polyp. Serrated lesions are frequently located on the folds of the colon (haustral folds).

== Pathophysiology ==
SPS is not caused by a single gene mutation. Several genetic abnormalities are associated with the condition, and a familial or inherited pattern may occur. Key genetic abnormalities include mutations in BRAF, abnormal CpG island methylator phenotype, and microsatellite instability. Additional implicated genes include SMAD4, BMPR1A, PTEN, GREM1, and MUTYH. The only validated genetic cause of SPS is germline mutations in RNF43. However, most individuals with SPS do not have a germline mutation in any of the associated genes, including RNF43. As the underlying genetic risks for SPS are not fully understood, genetic testing is not recommended. Both autosomal dominant and autosomal recessive patterns of inheritance have been reported, as well as sporadic. Individuals with SPS have serrated polyps, which include hyperplastic polyps, traditional serrated adenomas, and sessile serrated polyps. In addition to serrated polyps, adenomas are often identified.

== Diagnosis ==
The diagnosis of serrated polyposis syndrome is achieved when either one of two criteria are met: five or more serrated lesions/polyps proximal to the rectum (all ≥ 5 mm in size, with two lesions ≥10 mm), or >20 serrated lesions/polyps of any size distributed throughout the large bowel with five proximal to the rectum. Any serrated polyp is counted towards the diagnosis, including sessile serrated lesions, hyperplastic polyps, and traditional serrated adenomas. In addition, the cumulative number of serrated lesions is cumulative over time and includes multiple colonoscopies. The diagnosis of SPS is often overlooked, and requires lifelong tracking of cumulative serrated polyps.

== Treatment ==
Colonoscopy is the mainstay of treatment for SPS, which allows for the identification of polyps and removal. Polyp removal is recommended to prevent the development of colorectal cancer. If polyps are relatively few, then removal may be achieved with colonoscopy. After polyps are removed, which may require multiple colonoscopies to accomplish, repeat colonoscopy is recommended in 1 to 3 year intervals. On average, about 2.8 colonscopies are necessary to achieve control of disease. The majority of cases may be managed with colonoscopy alone. Narrow-band imaging, an imaging technique used to enhance features of mucosa seen during colonoscopy, may improve detection of serrated lesions; however, one multicenter trial did not show improved detection.

If polyps are very numerous, very large, or their growth cannot be controlled with colonoscopy, then surgery may be necessary. When surgery is necessary, a total abdominal colectomy with ileorectal anastomosis should be considered to minimize the risk of colon cancer. If surgery is necessary and involvement of polyps is focal or largely confined to a particular section of bowel, then segmental resection may be considered. Segmental resection is also recommended for cancer. In most cases, the rectum is left in place. Any remaining segments of colon or rectum require annual surveillance with colonoscopy.

First degree relatives of people with SPS are at a higher risk of colorectal cancer and SPS. As such, these individuals should undergo screening with colonoscopy beginning at the earliest of the following: 40 years of age, the age of the youngest diagnosis of SPS in the family, or 10 years younger than the earliest CRC related to SPS. Repeat colonoscopy should be performed at 5 year intervals.

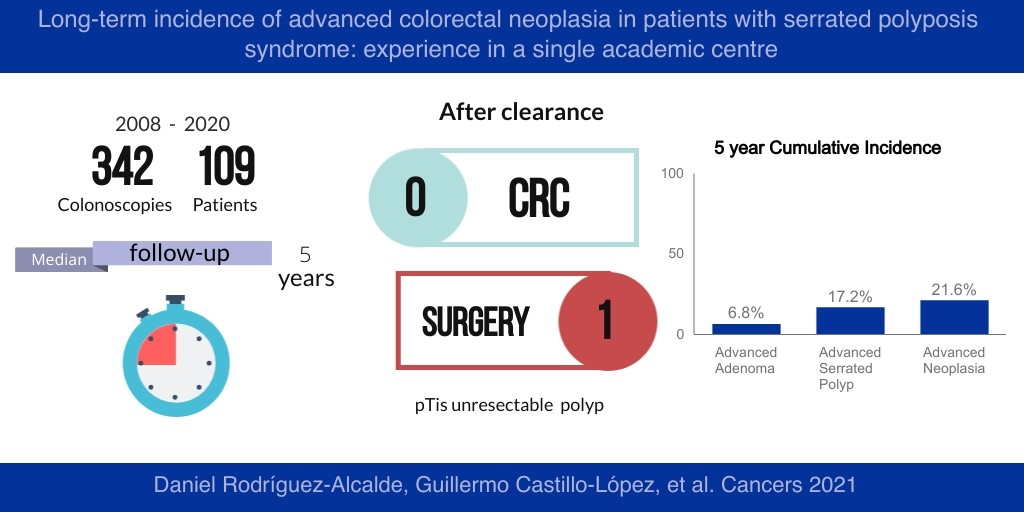
Long-term incidence of advanced colorectal neoplasia in patients with serrated polyposis syndrome in a single academic centre

== Prognosis ==
The overall risk of colorectal cancer is about 19.9%. However, the risk of cancer varies widely and depends on age, polyp burden, phenotype and the presence of dysplasia on histology. Endoscopic surveillance can decrease the risk of progression to cancer.

== History ==
The condition was originally known as hyperplastic polyposis syndrome. When the syndrome was first recognized, only hyperplastic polyps were included in its definition, and the syndrome was believed to not be associated with a higher risk of colorectal cancer. In 1996, a case series revealed an association of the syndrome with cancer and serrated adenomas. Subsequently, other types of serrated polyps were found to occur in this condition, so the name was adjusted to the present "serrated polyposis syndrome."

The World Health Organization released diagnostic criteria in 2010, which were updated in 2010 and again in 2019. The 2010 classification defined SPS as meeting any of the following criteria: 1) five or more serrated polyps proximal to the sigmoid colon with two larger than 10 mm in size, 2) any serrated polyps found proximal to the sigmoid colon in a person with a first-degree relative with serrated polyposis, or 3) more than 20 serrated colon polyps. The updated 2019 classification revised the first criterion to include lesions in the sigmoid colon, and excluded very small polyps (<5 mm). The updated 2019 classification also removed the criterion that included any serrated lesions proximal to the sigmoid colon in a person with a first degree relative with SPS.

== Epidemiology ==
Data regarding overall prevalence of SPS is lacking, but it is estimated to occur in roughly 1 in 100,000. SPS is equally common among men and women. Most individuals with SPS are diagnosed between 40 and 60 years of age, with an average age of 55 years. Nearly half of individuals with SPS have a family member with colorectal cancer. Most individuals (37–70%) with SPS fulfill criterion 3 of the 2010 criteria (now criteria 2 from the 2019 classification). Of the remaining individuals with SPS, roughly half meet only criterion 1 and half meet both criteria 1 and 3 (2010 classification).

Among individuals undergoing colonoscopy for the evaluation of an abnormal fecal occult blood test, the prevalence of SPS ranges from 0.34 to 0.66%. The overall prevalence of SPS is 0.03–0.5%. The prevalence of SPS is between 1 in 127 and 1 in 242 among individuals undergoing colonoscopy. SPS is associated with tobacco use. Aside from colorectal cancer, the risk of others cancers is not increased in people with SPS. Aspirin and nonsteroidal anti-inflammatory drug (NSAIDs) may be associated with a lower risk of SPS. SPS is the most common polyposis syndrome affecting the colon.

There is no clear association of SPS with any cancers other than colorectal cancer. However, there is mixed evidence regarding a possible association with SPS and pancreatic cancer. Individuals with a history of lymphoma have a higher risk of developing sessile serrated polyposis syndrome.
