= Polyp (medicine) =

Abnormal growth of tissue projecting from a mucous membrane

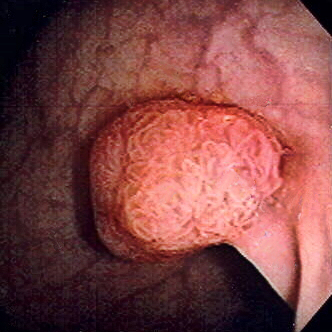
- Polyp of sigmoid colon as revealed by colonoscopy. Approximately 1 cm in diameter. The polyp was removed by snare cautery, 2009
- Specialty: Pathology

A polyp is an abnormal growth of tissue projecting from a mucous membrane. Polyps are commonly found in the colon, stomach, nose, ear, sinus(es), urinary bladder, and uterus. They may also occur elsewhere in the body where there are mucous membranes, including the cervix, vocal folds, and small intestine.

If it is attached by a narrow elongated stalk, it is said to be pedunculated; if it is attached without a stalk, it is said to be sessile.

Some polyps are tumors (neoplasms) and others are non-neoplastic, for example hyperplastic or dysplastic, which are benign. The neoplastic ones are usually benign, although some can be pre-malignant, or concurrent with a malignancy.

== Digestive polyps ==
Relative incidences by location:

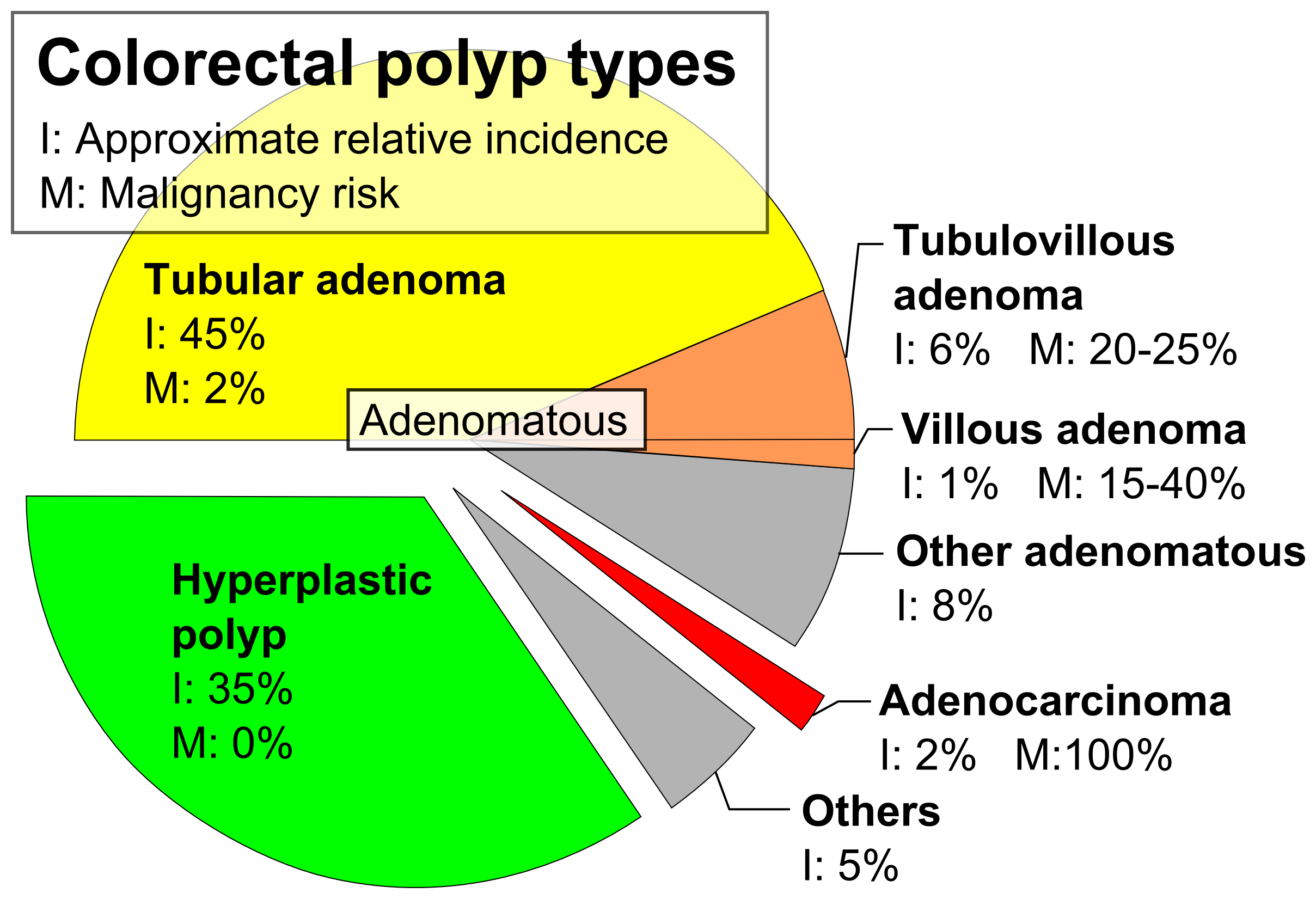
Incidences and malignancy risks of various types of colorectal polyps

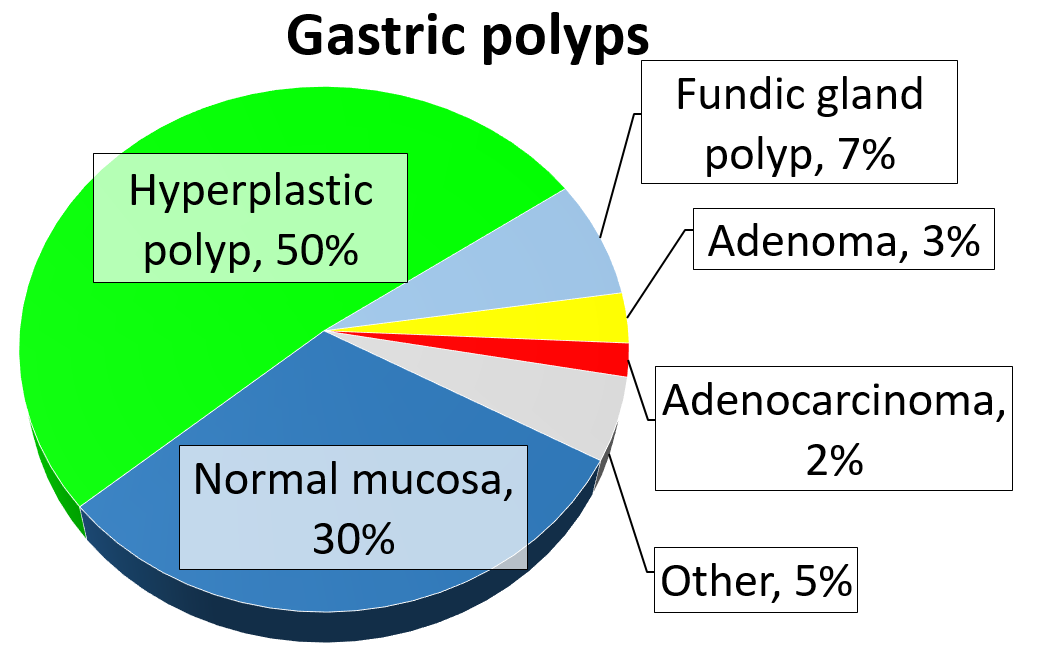
Relative incidences of gastric polyps

Polyp	Typical location	Histologic appearance	Risk of malignancy	Picture	Syndromes
Hyperplastic polyp	Colorectal (unless otherwise specified)	Serrated unbranched crypts	if polyps are more than 100		Serrated polyposis syndrome
Hyperplastic polyp of the stomach	Stomach	Elongated, tortuous, and cystic foveolae separated by edematous and inflamed stroma.			Gastric hyperplastic polyposis
Fundic gland polyp	Fundus of stomach	Cystically dilated glands lined by chief cells, parietal cells and mucinous foveolar cells.	Very low or none, when sporadic.		Fundic gland polyposis
Sessile serrated adenoma	Colorectal	Similar to hyperplastic with hyperserration, dilated/branched crypt base, prominent mucin cells at crypt base	Yes		Serrated polyposis syndrome
Inflammatory	Non-specific	Raised mucosa/submucosa with inflammation	If dysplasia develops		Inflammatory bowel disease, ulcers, infections, mucosal prolapse
Tubular Adenoma (Villous, Tubulovillous)	Colorectal	Tubular glands with elongated nuclei (at least low-grade atypia)	Yes		
Traditional serrated adenoma	Colorectal	Serrated crypts, often villous architecture, with cytologic atypia, eosinophilic cells	Yes		Serrated polyposis syndrome
Peutz-Jeghers Polyp	All digestive tract	Smooth muscle bundles between nonneoplastic epithelium, "Christmas tree" appearance	No		Peutz–Jeghers syndrome
Juvenile Polyp	Upper GI tract and colon	Cystically dilated glands with expanded lamina propria	Not inherently, may develop dysplasia		Juvenile polyposis syndrome, identical polyps in Cronkhite–Canada syndrome
Hamartomatous Polyp (Cowden Syndrome)	Mainly colorectal	Variable; classical mildly fibrotic polyp with disorganized mucosa and splaying of muscularis mucosae; also inflammatory, juvenile, lipoma, ganglioneuroma, lymphoid	No		Cowden syndrome
Inflammatory fibroid polyp	All digestive tract	Spindle cells, featuring concentric arrangements around blood vessels, and inflammation rich in eosinophils	none		

=== Colorectal polyp ===
While colon polyps are not commonly associated with symptoms, occasionally they may cause rectal bleeding, and on rare occasions pain, diarrhea or constipation. They are a concern because of the potential for colon cancer being present microscopically, and the risk of benign colon polyps becoming malignant over time. Since most polyps are asymptomatic, they are usually discovered at the time of colon cancer screening. Common screening methods are occult blood test, colonoscopy with a modern flexible endoscope, sigmoidoscopy (usually with the older rigid endoscope), lower gastrointestinal series (barium enema), digital rectal examination (DRE), virtual colonoscopy or Cologuard.

The polyps are routinely removed at the time of colonoscopy, either with a wire loop known as a polypectomy snare (first description by P. Deyhle, Germany, 1970), or with biopsy forceps. If an adenomatous polyp is found, it must be removed, since such a polyp is pre-cancerous and has a propensity to become cancerous. For certainty, all polyps which are found by any diagnostic modality, are removed by a colonoscopy.

In the US, if a colonoscopy finds polyps that are 10mm or bigger, numerous or abnormal, a repeat colonoscopy may be required (within three years). If one or two are found that are less than 5mm in diameter you may not have to return for a colonoscopy for five or more years. If none are found, a repeat colonoscopy may not be required for 10 years. Most colon polyps can be categorized as sporadic.

=== Inherited polyposis syndromes ===
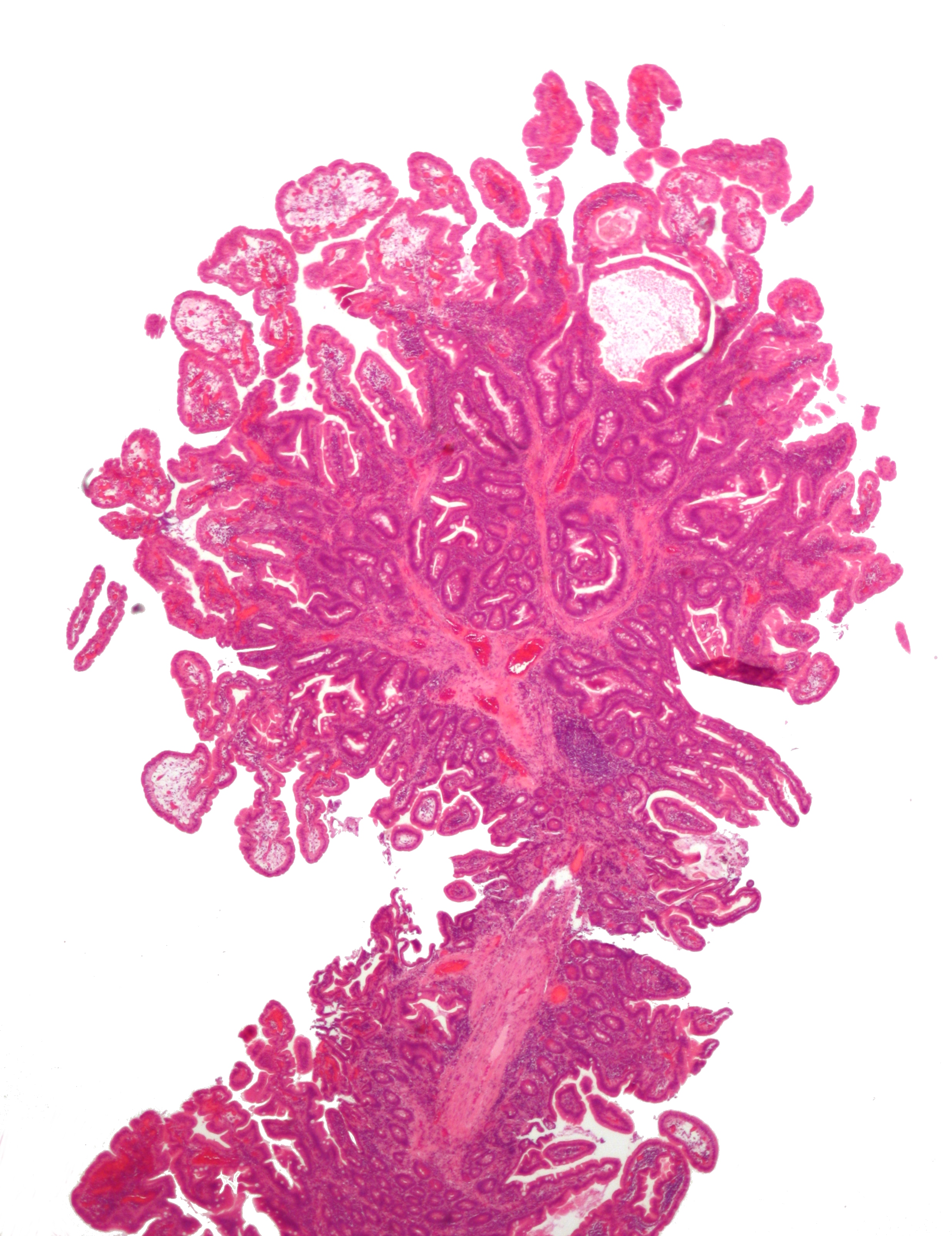
Micrograph of a Peutz–Jeghers colonic polyp – a type of hamartomatous polyp. H&E stain.

- Familial adenomatous polyposis
- Peutz–Jeghers syndrome
- Turcot syndrome
- Juvenile polyposis syndrome
- Cowden disease
- Bannayan–Riley–Ruvalcaba syndrome (Bannayan–Zonana syndrome)
- Gardner's syndrome
- Serrated polyposis syndrome

=== Non-inherited polyposis syndromes ===
- Cronkhite–Canada syndrome

=== Types of colon polyps ===
- Malignant
- Hamartomatous
- Hyperplastic
- Inflammatory: Inflammatory fibroid polyp

=== Adenomatous polyps ===
Adenomatous polyps, or adenomas, are polyps that grow on the lining of the colon and which carry a high risk of cancer. The adenomatous polyp is considered pre-malignant, i.e., likely to develop into colon cancer. The other types of polyps that can occur in the colon are hyperplastic and inflammatory polyps, which are unlikely to develop into colorectal cancer.

About 5% of people aged 60 will have at least one adenomatous polyp of 1 cm diameter or greater. Multiple adenomatous polyps often result from familial polyposis coli or familial adenomatous polyposis, a condition that carries a very high risk of colon cancer.

==== Types ====
Adenomas constitute approximately 10% of digestive polyps. Most polyps (approximately 90%) are small, usually less than 1 cm in diameter, and have a small potential for malignancy. The remaining 10% of adenomas are larger than 1 cm and approach a 10% chance of containing invasive cancer.

There are three types of adenomatous polyp:

- Tubular adenomas (tube-like shape) are the most common of the adenomatous polyps; they may occur everywhere in the colon and they are the least likely colon polyps to develop into colon cancer
- Tubulovillous
- Villous adenomas are commonly found in the rectal area and they are normally larger in size than the other two types of adenomas. They tend to be non-pedunculated, velvety, or cauliflower-like in appearance and they are associated with the highest morbidity and mortality rates of all polyps. They can cause hypersecretory syndromes characterized by hypokalemia and profuse mucous discharge, and can harbor carcinoma in situ or invasive carcinoma more frequently than other adenomas.

==== Risks ====
The risks of progression to colorectal cancer increase if the polyp is larger than 1 cm and contains a higher percentage of villous component. Also, the shape of the polyps is related to the risk of progression into carcinoma. Polyps that are pedunculated (with a stalk) are usually less dangerous than sessile polyps (flat polyps). Sessile polyps have a shorter pathway for migration of invasive cells from the tumor into submucosal and more distant structures, and they are also more difficult to remove and ascertain. Sessile polyps larger than 2 cm usually contain villous features, have a higher malignant potential, and tend to recur following colonoscopic polypectomy.

Although polyps do not carry significant risk of colon cancer, tubular adenomatous polyps may become cancerous when they grow larger. Larger tubular adenomatous polyps have an increased risk of malignancy when larger because then they develop more villous components and may become sessile.

It is estimated that an individual whose parents have been diagnosed with an adenomatous polyp has a 50% greater chance to develop colon cancer than individuals with no family history of colonic polyps. Research suggests approximately 5 percent of colon cancer cases are due to an inherited genetic mutation.

==== Screening ====
Screening for colonic polyps as well as preventing them has become an important part of the management of the condition. Medical societies have established guidelines for colorectal screening in order to prevent adenomatous polyps and to minimize the chances of developing colon cancer. It is believed that some changes in the diet might be helpful in preventing polyps from occurring, but there is no other way to prevent the polyps from developing into cancerous growths than detecting and removing them.

Colon polyps as they grow can sometimes cause bleeding within the intestine, which can be detected by an occult blood test. According to American Cancer Society guidelines, people over 50 should have an annual occult blood test. People in their 50s are recommended to have flexible sigmoidoscopies performed once every 3 to 5 years to detect any abnormal growth which could be an adenomatous polyp. If adenomatous polyps are detected during this procedure, a colonoscopy is recommended. Medical societies recommend colonoscopies every ten years starting at age 50 as a necessary screening practice for colon cancer. The screening provides an accurate image of the intestine and also allows the removal of the polyp, if found.

Once an adenomatous polyp is identified during colonoscopy, they can be treated with a polypectomy, minimally invasive surgery or in cases with additional risk factors, a total proctocolectomy. Colonoscopies are preferred over sigmoidoscopies because they allow the examination of the entire colon and can detect polyps in the upper colon, where more than half of polyps occur.

It has been statistically demonstrated that screening programs are effective in reducing the number of deaths caused by colon cancer due to adenomatous polyps. The risk of complications associated with colonoscopies is approximately 0.35 percent, compared to a lifetime risk of developing colon cancer of around 6 percent. As there is a small likelihood of recurrence, further screening after polyp removal is recommended.

== Endometrial polyp ==
An endometrial polyp or uterine polyp is a polyp or lesion in the lining of the uterus (endometrium) that takes up space within the uterine cavity. Commonly occurring, they are experienced by up to 10% of women. They may have a large flat base (sessile) or be attached to the uterus by an elongated pedicle (pedunculated). Pedunculated polyps are more common than sessile ones. They range in size from a few millimeters to several centimeters. If pedunculated, they can protrude through the cervix into the vagina. Small blood vessels may be present in polyps, particularly large ones.

== Cervical polyp ==
A cervical polyp is a common benign polyp or tumor on the surface of the cervical canal. They can cause irregular menstrual bleeding or increased pain but often show no symptoms.

== Nasal polyps ==
Nasal polyps are polypoidal masses arising mainly from the mucous membranes of the nose and paranasal sinuses. They are overgrowths of the mucosa that frequently accompany allergic rhinitis. They can be caused by inflammation and chronic sinusitis. Small nasal polyps may cause no symptoms, but larger nasal polyps can cause nasal congestion, headaches or rhinorrhea, along with other symptoms.

== Laryngeal polyps ==
Polyps on the vocal folds can take on many different forms, and can sometimes result from vocal abuse, although this is not always the cause. They can occur on one or both vocal folds, and appear as swelling, a bump (similar to a nodule), a stalk-like growth, or a blister-like lesion. Most polyps are larger than nodules, which are more similar to callouses on the vocal folds. Polyps and nodules can exhibit similar symptoms including hoarseness or breathiness, "rough" or "scratchy" voice, harshness in vocal quality, shooting pain from ear to ear, sensation of having "a lump in the back of the throat", neck pain, decreased pitch range in the voice, and vocal and bodily fatigue.

If an individual experiences symptoms for more than 2 to 3 weeks, they should see a physician. For a diagnosis, a thorough evaluation of the voice should include a physical examination, preferably by an otolaryngologist (ear, nose, and throat doctor) who specializes in voice, a voice evaluation with a speech-language pathologist (SLP), a neurological examination (in certain cases) The qualities of the voice that will be evaluated include quality, pitch, loudness, and ability to sustain voicing. In some cases, an instrumental examination may be performed with an endoscope into the mouth or nose; this gives a clear look at the vocal folds and larynx in general. In addition to this, a stroboscope (flashing light) may be used to observe the movement of the vocal folds during speech.

Polyps may be treated with medical, surgical, or behavioral intervention. Surgical intervention involves removing the polyp from the vocal fold. This approach is only used when the growth(s) are very large or have existed for an extended amount of time. In children, surgical intervention is rare. Existing medical problems may be treated in an effort to reduce the strain and negative impact on the vocal cords. This could include treatment for gastrointestinal reflux disease, allergies, and thyroid problems. Intervention to stop smoking and reduce stress may also be needed. Most people receive behavioral intervention, or vocal therapy, from an SLP. This might involve teaching good vocal hygiene, and reducing or stopping vocal abuse behaviors. Direct voice treatments may be used to alter pitch, loudness, or breathe support to promote good voicing.

== Etymology ==
The name is of ancient origin, in use in English from about 1400 for a nasal polyp, from Latin polypus through Greek. The animal of similar appearance called polyp is attested from 1742, although the word was earlier used for an octopus.
