= Saola Working Group =

U.S. nonprofit organization

- Founded: 2006
- Type: Non-profit organization
- Purpose: Saola conservation
- Location(s): Laos and Vietnam
- Region served: Annamite Range
- Key people: William Robichaud (Coordinator)
- Volunteers: 18
- Website: www.savethesaola.org

The Saola Working Group (SWG) is a working group of the IUCN Species Survival Commission's Asian Wild Cattle Specialist Group, created in 2006 to protect the Saola (Pseudoryx nghetinhensis) and its habitat. The Conservancy works to engage and incorporate local communities in protecting saolas in the Annamite Range mountains on the border of Laos and Vietnam.

The Saola is one of the most endangered mammal species in the world. Discovered in 1992 it was the first large mammal new to science in more than 50 years and has never been seen by a biologist in the wild. The Saola Working Group is a coalition that includes about 40 experts from the forestry departments of Laos and Vietnam, Vietnam's Institute of Ecology and Biological Resources, Vinh University, and biologists and conservationists from Wildlife Conservation Society and the World Wildlife Fund.

== Programs ==
The Saola Working Group works with local communities in both Vietnam and Laos to raise awareness of the importance of the Saola. Villagers are hired to remove hunting snares that are among the biggest threats to the animal. Camera traps to document range and population of Saola are another primary focus. New research published showing that leeches can store DNA from their meals for several months has led the SWG to sample leeches in the Annamite Range in hopes to find saola DNA.

William Robichaud, representing the Saola Working Group, is a regular featured guest speaker at the annual Wildlife Conservation Network Expo.

== See also ==
- Saola Foundation
- Wildlife Conservation Network
- Conservation movement
- Environmental movement
- Natural environment
- Sustainability
