= Mai Hoa =

- Interactive map of Mai Hoa
- Coordinates: 18.42844504117365°N 105.54287622694225°E
- Country: Vietnam
- Region: North Central Coast
- Province: Hà Tĩnh
- Established: 16 June 2025

Area
  - Total: 45.85 km^{2} (17.70 sq mi)

Population (31 December 2024)
  - Total: 11,065
  - Density: 241/km^{2} (620/sq mi)

Mai Hoa is a commune in Hà Tĩnh province, Vietnam.

Mai Hoa commune was formerly part of Vũ Quang district, Hà Tĩnh province.

On 16 June 2025, the Standing Committee of the National Assembly of Vietnam issued Resolution No. 1665/NQ-UBTVQH15 on the arrangement of commune-level administrative units in Hà Tĩnh province in 2025. Under the resolution, the entire area and population of Ân Phú commune, Đức Giang commune, and Đức Lĩnh commune were merged to form a new commune named Mai Hoa.
