= Vũ Quang National Park =

National park in Vietnam

- Vườn quốc gia Vũ Quang
- IUCN category II (national park)
- Location within Vietnam
- Location: North Central Coast
- Nearest city: Hanoi
- Coordinates: 18°17′30″N 105°24′30″E
- Area: 550.28 km^{2} (212.46 sq mi)
- Established: 2002
- Governing body: People's Committee of Hà Tĩnh Province

Vũ Quang National Park is a national park in Vũ Quang area, Hà Tĩnh Province, North Central Coast, Vietnam. This park contains biodiversity. Saola and giant muntjac are found in this park. Vũ Quang is a remote forested region of Vietnam, in which several new species of deer and antelope have been discovered since the 1990s. Some are so new that scientific description is still pending, although most have local names.

The area was declared a forest reserve in 1986 and a national park in 2002. The national park has an area of 212 square miles (550 square kilometers).

== List of new animals ==
New animals from Vũ Quang and surrounding areas:

- Saola or Vu Quang ox (Pseudoryx nghetinhensis)
- Quang khem (slow deer)
- Giant muntjac (Megamuntiacus vuquangensis) – the world's largest muntjac
- Northern white-cheeked gibbon (Nomascus leucogenys)

In addition, Vũ Quang is home to five new species of fish:

- Parazacco vuquangensis
- Crossocheilus vuha
- Pararhoedus philanthropus
- Pararhoedus equalitus
- Oreoglanis libertus

In addition to these animals, there are some tantalising glimpses of more:

- A large, cream-coloured slow loris was seen in Hanoi Zoo by Doug Richardson, assistant curator of mammals at London Zoo in 1994.
- A black muntjac was seen in Laos by George Schaller of New York's Wildlife Conservation Society in 1994.
- The skull and some meat from the Vietnamese warty pig (Sus bucculensis) was given to Schaller on the same visit. The species was first described in 1892 but no physical evidence for it was ever secured.
