= Snare =

Snare most often refers to:

- Snare drum
- Snare trap, a kind of trap used for capturing animals

Snare may also refer to:

== Art and entertainment ==
- Snare, a science fiction novel by Katharine Kerr
- Snare, a Decepticon in the Transformers universe
- The Snare (1912 film), an American silent film
- The Snare (1918 film), a British silent film
- The Snare (2025 film), an American crime thriller
- Snare, the supervillain alias of Carla Draper in DC Comics.

== Medicine ==
- SNARE (protein), a family of proteins involved in vesicle fusion
- Snare technique (surgery), a technique used for surgical extraction and cauterization
- Vascular snare, a surgical device

== People ==
- C. J. Snare, a rock and roll singer
- Joanne Snare, American laser scientist

== Other uses ==
- Snare (software), a group of security tools for logging computer activity
- The Snares, a group of islands approximately 200 kilometres south of New Zealand
- Snares penguin, a bird indigenous to the islands
