= Saola Foundation =

U.S. nonprofit organization

- Saola Foundation for Annamite Mountains Conservation
- Formation: 2017
- Type: nonprofit
- Tax ID no.: 82-3731270
- Legal status: 501(c)(3)
- Headquarters: United States
- Website: www.saolafoundation.org

The Saola Foundation, also known as the Saola Foundation for Annamite Mountains Conservation, is a United States-based nonprofit wildlife conservation organization. Its work centers on the saola (Pseudoryx nghetinhensis), a critically endangered bovid endemic to the Annamite Mountains in Laos and Vietnam. The species has not been conclusively documented in the wild since a camera-trap photograph was taken in Vietnam in 2013. The foundation runs an intensive field search in Laos intended to locate surviving saolas so that a conservation breeding program can be established.

== History ==
The Saola Foundation was established in 2017 as a U.S. non-profit organization. In 2020 it transitioned to new leadership and evolved, with an expanded mission, to the Saola Foundation for Annamite Mountains Conservation. Besides the saola, it also works on other threatened species of the Annamite Range, such as the large-antlered muntjac and a recently documented undescribed species of leaf-monkey. Wildlife populations in the region have been severely reduced, primarily by industrial-scale wire snare poaching across Southeast Asia. Snares are indiscriminate: while poachers often target animals such as pangolins or big cats for traditional medicine, saolas are caught as bycatch.

Following a determination by the IUCN Species Survival Commission's Saola Working Group and the saola's range countries in 2017 that capturing surviving animals to start a conservation breeding program was the best path forward to avoid extinction, the foundation was co-founded by conservationist William Robichaud to work within the Annamite bioregion. In January 2025, the foundation signed a Memorandum of Understanding (MoU) with the government of Lao PDR, covering a two-year intensive search for the saola and the training of Lao conservation staff.

== Conservation efforts ==
The foundation's main project is a systematic search for surviving saolas in central Laos. Published estimates of the global population range up to about 100 individuals, while the foundation's technical director, Rob Timmins, estimates that no more than 50 remain. Only a small fraction of their potential habitat has been intensively surveyed. Because saolas exist at extremely low densities and are highly elusive, the Saola Foundation employs a combination of traditional tracking and advanced technology. It uses Lao wildlife trackers, including members of local indigenous communities, and scent detection dogs supported by Working Dogs for Conservation, in addition to rapid DNA testing.

To identify dung samples in the field, the foundation worked with the Wildlife Conservation Society (WCS) Molecular Diagnostics Lab at the Bronx Zoo to develop a rapid DNA field tester. The kit can confirm the presence of saola DNA within about two hours.

The foundation's field efforts operate under the IUCN's "One Plan" approach. If saolas are located, the aim is to capture enough animals to start a conservation breeding program, with the long-term goal of returning captive-bred animals to the wild.

As of 2026, the Saola Foundation's partners and funders include Wildlife Conservation Society, Givskud Zoo, Odense Zoo, Mandai Nature, Synchronicity Earth, Critical Ecosystem Partnership Fund, Working Dogs for Conservation, CyberTracker Conservation, and other organizations.
