= Inferior vena cava filter =

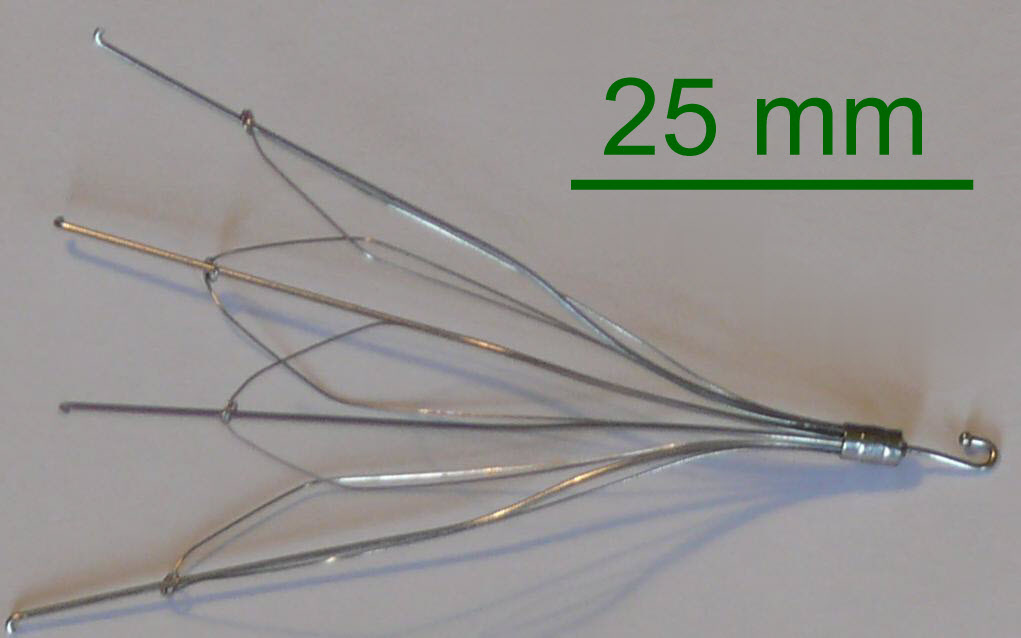
- Inferior vena cava filter - Gunther Tulip.
- Other names: IVC filter
- Specialty: Interventional radiology, vascular surgery

An inferior vena cava filter is a medical device made of metal that is implanted by vascular surgeons or interventional radiologists into the inferior vena cava to prevent a life-threatening pulmonary embolism (PE) or venous thromboembolism (VTE).

The filter is designed to trap a blood clot and prevent its travel to the lung where it would form a pulmonary embolism. Their effectiveness and safety profile is well established, and they may be used when anticoagulant treatment is not sufficient.

Results from the PREPIC study and other studies which have shown many long-term complications of IVC filters led to the introduction of retrievable IVC filters. The first retrievable IVC filters were approved by FDA in 2003 and 2004.

In 2012, the American College of Chest Physicians recommended IVC filters for those with contraindications to anticoagulation who either have acute PE or acute proximal deep vein thrombosis (above the knee).

== History ==
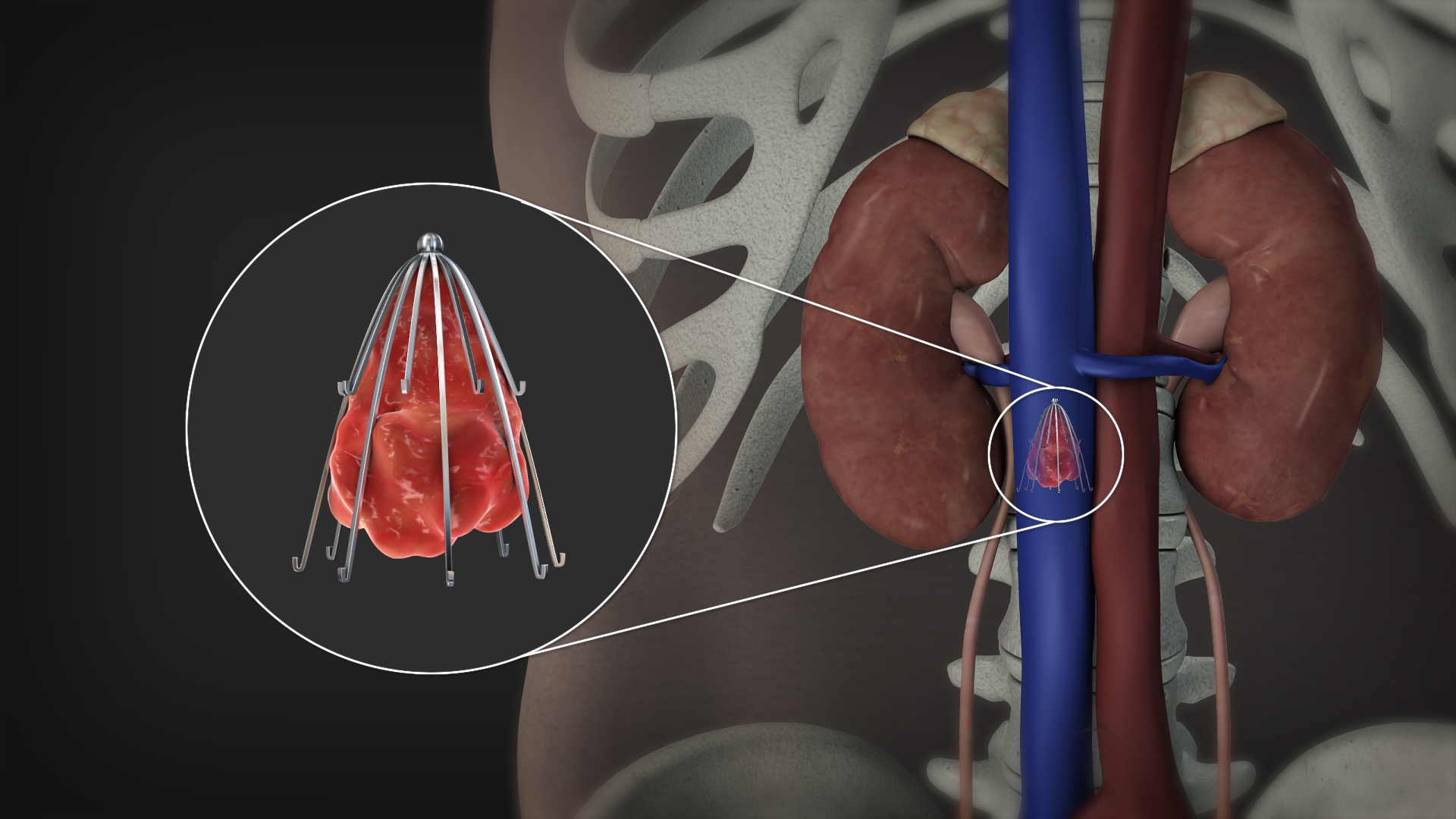
Image showing an inferior vena cava filter in its position

The first IVC filter was created by Kazi Mobin-Uddin who published his findings in 1969 in the New England Journal of Medicine. The Mobin-Uddin filter was later replaced by the Greenfield filter developed by Lazar Greenfield which had a lower rate of filter related complications.

== Medical uses ==
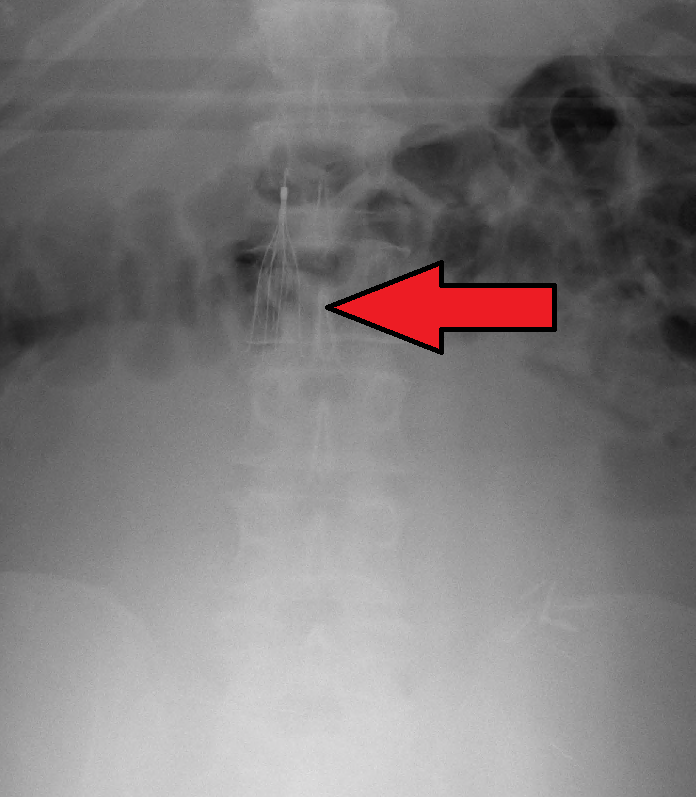
Inferior vena cava filter as seen on plain X ray of the abdomen

While the ability to retrieve a filter does exist for many models, it cannot be guaranteed that all cases of filter placement will allow for, or be indicated for retrieval. Thus, the requirements and indications for permanent placement of filters is used to decide on when to use both permanent and temporary IVC filters.

Long-term risk factors must be considered as well, to include life expectancy of more than six months following insertion, and the ability of the patient to comply with anticoagulation therapy. The decision to use a filter that is temporary vs permanent basically is tied to the expected duration of time that protection is needed to prevent pulmonary emboli from passing to the heart and lungs. One such guideline is outlined below:

- Contraindications to anticoagulation; e.g. a patient with DVT or PE who has another condition that puts them at risk of bleeding, such as a recent bleed into the brain, or a patient about to undergo major surgery
- Short-term risk of PE/Short-term contraindication of anticoagulation: Usually merits a retrievable filter
- Uncertain risk of PE and/or lack of control for anticoagulation: Usually results in permanent filters for long term management
- Long-term risk of PE/recurrent PE/recurrent DVT: permanent filter

=== Indication categories ===
While many studies have been done on the efficacy of Vena Cava filters, there still have not been any major studies done on the actual placement and removal of the filters regarding standard guidelines. Which is why the Society of Interventional Radiology created a multidisciplinary panel that developed the following guidelines to see if someone qualifies for implantation:

==== Absolute indications ====
These are patients that should strongly consider having IVC filter placement, as they are at greatest risk of pulmonary embolus.

- Proven VTE: Venous thromboembolism and contraindication or complication due to anticoagulation therapy
- Recurrent VTE: Despite adequate anticoagulation therapy

==== Relative indications ====
This is a maybe category; normally it represents patients who could benefit from an IVC filter, but may be just fine without one as well.

- Proven VTE: High risk of contraindication or complication to arise during anticoagulation therapy
- Large, free-floating proximal DVTs
- Poor compliance: INR levels are not stable, not taking medicine as directed
- Thrombolysis: Iliocaval DVT's, which are emboli in the Illiac region

==== Prophylactic indications ====
These are usually very controversial reasons to do an IVC filter, and most radiologists and doctors generally will not recommend an IVC filter if other options are available instead.

- No VTE: Anticoagulation therapy is not possible (high risk of bleeding)
- Transient risk of VTE: Trauma, surgical procedures or medical conditions

==== Other indications ====
- Bariatric patients: Undergoing surgery for weight control, only if BMI greater than 55, previous history of DVT/PE, hypercoagulable state, chronic venous insufficiency, truncal obesity or contraindication to anticoagulation therapy.

=== Indications for removing IVC filter ===
There is no current published data confirming the benefit of removing an IVC. Because of this, the Society of Interventional Radiology created a multidisciplinary panel that developed the following guidelines to see if someone qualifies for removal:

- No need for permanent filter: Remove temporary
- Low risk of significant PE: Continued anticoagulation is working, remove temporary
- No expected near-term high-risk PE: Continuation of anticoagulation therapy, remove temporary
- Life expectancy of more than six months: Remove temporary
- Ability to retrieve the filter: No complications, no tear probability, no trauma probability; if so, remove temporary

An IVC filter, just by doing its job properly (catching embolic material), can eventually fill up with embolic material and cause a circulatory impairment that may warrant revision with vascular surgery (new filter, stent additions, or otherwise). A representative case has been reported in science journalism of the type that reports interesting unusual causes and solutions of symptoms; in this instance, the symptom was orthostatic hypotension. Physicians speculate that this problem is uncommon but nonetheless worth consideration in differential diagnosis.

=== Anticoagulation ===
In those with initial acute proximal DVT or acute PE who had IVC filters placed instead of anticoagulation, and who have their risk of bleeding resolve, the American College of Chest Physicians suggested, in 2012, that they receive a standard course of anticoagulation. While IVC filters are associated with a long term risk of DVT, they are not, alone, reason enough to maintain extended anticoagulation.

== Side effects ==
The main function of a vena cava filter is to prevent death from massive pulmonary emboli. Long-term clinical follow-up studies have shown that this is accomplished in 96% of cases having a standard stainless-steel Greenfield filter.

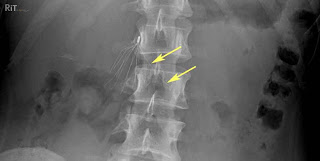
Abdominal radiograph shows that one of the legs (arrows) of the IVC filter is pointed away from the expected IVC lumen.

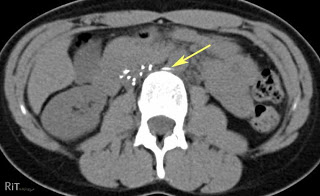
Axial CT image confirms that one of the legs (arrow) of the IVC filter has migrated out of the IVC wall into an adjacent tissue.

=== FDA communication ===
In August, 2010, the FDA released an Initial Communication on the Risk and Adverse events associated with Long Term use of an inferior vena cava filter. Over a period of about 5 years, they identify 921 events. While not the majority of cases, that number still represents a statistical significance of the use of long-term IVCs.

Of these IVC filter side effects, 328 involved device migration, 146 involved embolizations after detachment of device components, 70 involved perforation of the IVC, and 56 involved filter fracture. Much of the medical community believes that this large number of adverse events is related to the heart filter remaining in place for longer than necessary.

Common issues relating to failure, to include death (the other 4% of cases) include:

- Device-associated morbidity
- Device migration
- Filter embolization
- Filter fracture
- Insertion-site thrombosis
- Perforation of the vena cava
- Recurrent DVT
- Recurrent PE
- Thrombotic complications
- Vena cava thrombosis

=== Less common adverse reactions ===
While these side effects are not common (less than 10-20% of patients), many do report issues stemming from the placement and complication of the IVC while inside of the body.

- 9% (12 of 132 patients) delayed filter penetration of the IVC greater than 3 mm
- Parts of filter broke off in 2% (5 of 230 patients)
- Caval filter migrated to heart or pulmonary artery (4 patients)

Numerous small published articles and case studies report describe similar issues to the above. Most notably:

- Filter fracture: Broken struts migrate to retroperitoneum, requiring exploration. Also struts can migrate to the heart and can cause pericardial effusion and tamponade.
- Perforation into the duodenum: Resulting in severe diarrhea and weight loss.
- Arterial hemorrhage: Requires surgery to avoid death.
- Misplaced Filter: Causes pericardiac tamponade requiring surgery under cardiopulmonary bypass.
- Filter Migration to Right Atrium: Resulting in acute myocardial infarction.
- Filter Lodged in Heart: Causes life-threatening arrhythmia and often requires pacemakers to resolve condition.
- Heart Migration: Requires surgery to remove IVC from heart.
- Sudden Death: Caused by the filter migrating to an active region in the heart.
- Migration of Filter to Chest: Requires surgery.
- Perforation of filter strut into small-bowel: Requires surgery to repair perforation.

Even though the cases above are the exception, and not the rule, most radiologists object to doing prophylactic filter insertions in patients who do not have thromboembolic diseases. For the most part, whenever possible, interventional radiologists would rather start the patient on anticoagulants than use an IVC, even if requested or referred via a doctor.

=== MRI ===
While most IVC filters are made of non-ferromagnetic materials, there are a few types that are weakly ferromagnetic. Accordingly, IVC filters fall under the MRI Safe and MRI Conditional categories depending mostly on type of material used during construction. Rarely will one find an MRI Not Safe IVC filter, as most of the steel, and other ferromagnetic material devices have been discontinued via the FDA.

IVC filters are attached to the vena cava via hooks on their ends. Some are compression springs, which compress outward onto the side wall of the vena cava; however, they still have small hooks that retain their location. These hooks aid in the anchoring and healing process, as they allow the tissues to 'ingrow' around them, securing the IVC in place. It is unlikely, then, after 4 to 6 weeks of healing, that an MRI of 1.5 tesla, up to 3 tesla, will cause any level of dislodging to occur to the IVC filter.

Studies of MR examination of both animals and humans, with implanted IVC filters, have not reported complications or symptomatic filter displacement.

Several animal studies have even used "real-time" MR for the placement of IVC filters to check for rotation, sheering, and other artifacts.

As part of the 'routing' survey for MRI studies, patients who have IVC filters will often need verification from the doctor, or medical records, to state that the IVC is safe for the MRI. Most patients with weakly or non-safe ferromagnetic implants will be given a card, which they keep on their person at all time, that can help isolate if it is safe to do an MRI.

For patients who have been denied MRI scans for safety reasons, doctors usually recommend the CT scan with contrast as an alternative.

=== Labeling and recommendations ===
Most IVC filters that have been tested have been labeled as "MRi safe"; the remainder of IVC filters that have been tested are "MR conditional." Patients who have been treated with nonferromagnetic IVC filters can undergo MR examination any time after filter implantation. In patients who have been treated with a weakly ferromagnetic IVC filter (Gianturco bird nest IVC filter [Cook], stainless steel Greenfield vena cava filter [Boston Scientific]), it is advised that the patient wait at least six weeks before undergoing an MR examination (because these older devices initially may not be anchored as firmly in place as other devices discussed in the present context), unless there is a strong clinical indication to perform the MR examination sooner after implantation, and as long as there is no reason to suspect that the device is not positioned properly or that it is not firmly in place. Most studies of IVC filters have generally been conducted at 1.5 tesla or less, although many IVC filters have now been evaluated at 3 tesla and deemed acceptable for MR examination.

== Placement ==
IVC filters are placed endovascularly, meaning that they are inserted via the blood vessels. Historically, IVC filters were placed surgically, but with modern filters that can be compressed into much thinner catheters, access to the venous system can be obtained via the femoral vein (the large vein in the groin), the internal jugular vein (the large vein in the neck) or the arm veins with one design. Choice of route depends mainly on the number and location of any blood clot within the venous system. To place the filter, a catheter is guided into the IVC using fluoroscopic guidance, then the filter is pushed through the catheter and deployed into the desired location, usually just below the junction of the IVC and the lowest renal vein.

Review of prior cross-sectional imaging or a venogram of the IVC is performed before deploying the filter to assess for potential anatomic variations, thrombi within the IVC, or areas of stenoses, as well as to estimate the diameter of the IVC. Rarely, ultrasound-guided placement is preferred in the setting of contrast allergy, chronic kidney disease, and when patient immobility is desired. The size of the IVC may affect which filter is deployed, as some (such as the Birds Nest) are approved to accommodate larger cavae. There are situations where the filter is placed above the renal veins (e.g. pregnant patients or women of childbearing age, renal or gonadal vein thromboses, etc.). Also, if there is duplication of the IVC, the filter is placed above the confluence of the two IVCs or a filter can be placed within each IVC.

== Retrieval ==
The concept of a removable IVC filter was first conceived in 1967. In 2003 and 2004 the United States Food and Drug Administration first approved retrievable filters. In 2005 that the Society of Interventional Radiology (SIR) convened a multidisciplinary conference to address the clinical application of nonpermanent vena cava filters.

Retrievable filters are fitted with a device (varying from model to model) that allows them to be easily snared and pulled back into a catheter and removed from the body, often through the jugular vein. Prior to 2004, filters that had been in the IVC for less than three weeks were considered suitable to attempt retrieval, as filters that have been in place longer might have been overgrown by cells from the IVC wall and there was an increased risk of IVC injury if the filter is dislodged. Newer designs, and developments in techniques mean that some filters can now be left in for prolonged periods and retrievals after a year are now being reported. This would include the ALN, Bard G2 and G2x, Option, Tulip and Celect filters.

The clinical exam prior to the removal of the filter is vital in understanding both the risk and pathophysiological effects removing the filter will have on the patient. Doctors and medical professionals must consider several key factors (see Indications for removing IVC filters).
