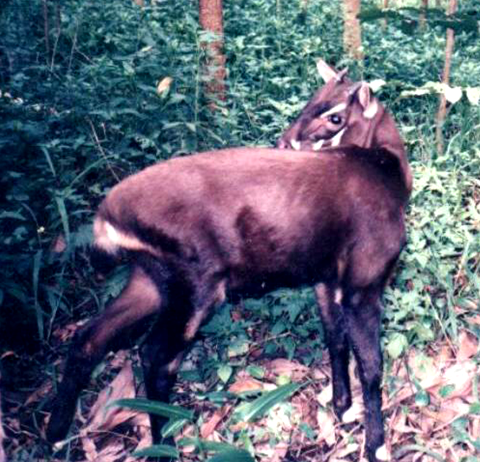
- Camera trap photo

Conservation status
- Critically Endangered (IUCN 3.1)
- CITES Appendix I

Scientific classification
- Kingdom: Animalia
- Phylum: Chordata
- Class: Mammalia
- Order: Artiodactyla
- Family: Bovidae
- Subfamily: Bovinae
- Tribe: Bovini
- Genus: Pseudoryx; Dung, Giao, Chinh, Tuoc, Arctander & MacKinnon, 1993
- Species: P. nghetinhensis

Binomial name
- Pseudoryx nghetinhensis Dung, Giao, Chinh, Tuoc, Arctander & MacKinnon, 1993
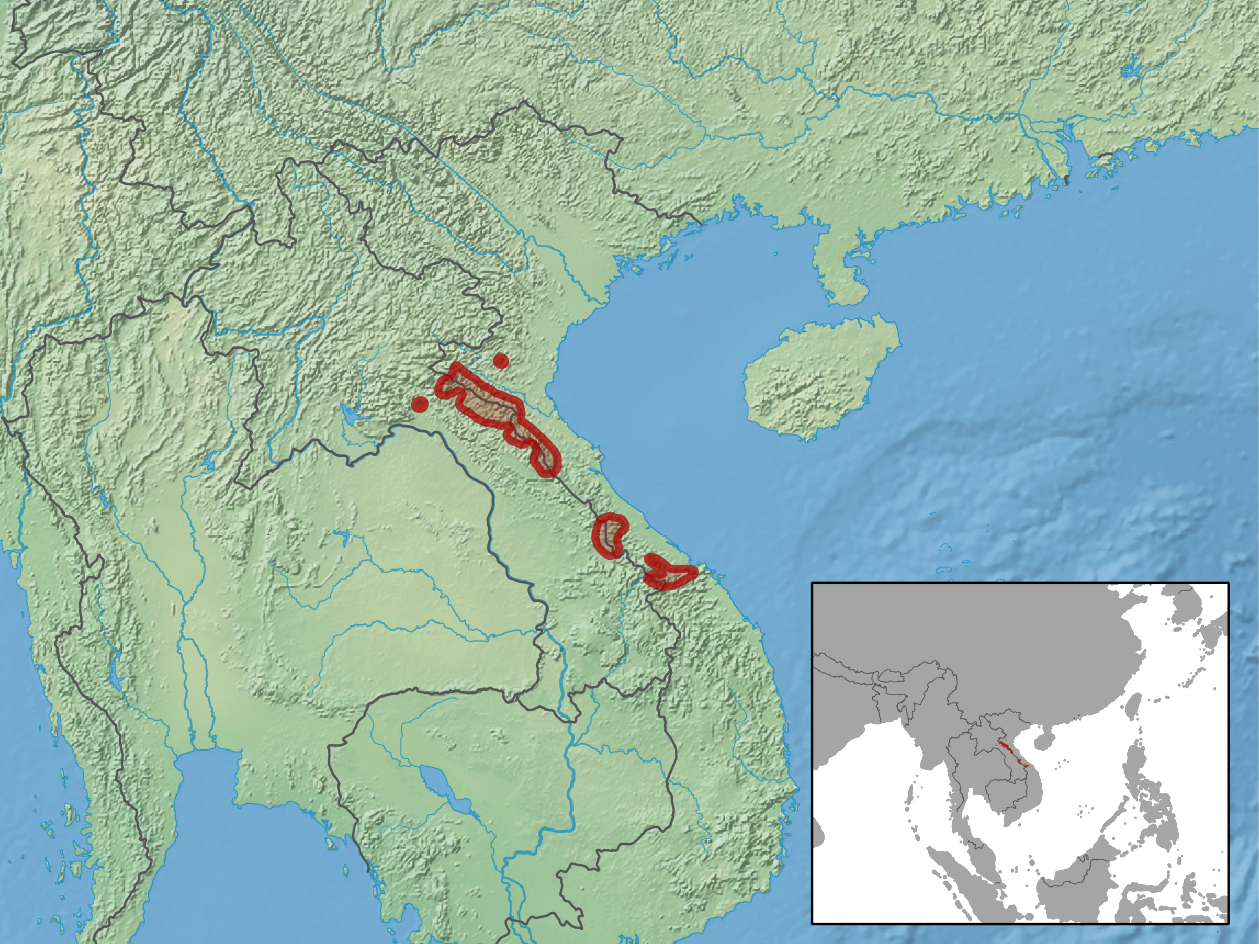
- Range in Vietnam and Laos

= Saola =

Species of mammal

The saola (Pseudoryx nghetinhensis), also called the spindlehorn, Asian unicorn, or infrequently, Vũ Quang bovid, is a forest-dwelling bovid native to the Annamite Range in Vietnam and Laos. It was first described in 1993 following a discovery of remains in Vũ Quang National Park by a joint survey of the Vietnamese Ministry of Forestry and the World Wide Fund for Nature, Saolas have since been kept in captivity multiple times, although only for short periods as they died within a matter of weeks to months.

Saola live in restricted areas of high-altitude wet evergreen forest and have probably always had a relatively low population density. The first photograph of a living saola was taken in captivity in 1993. The most recent one was taken in 2013 by a movement-triggered camera in the forest of central Vietnam, which represents the most recent record of the saola. The saola is listed as critically endangered by the IUCN, being heavily threatened by snares intended to trap other animals within their forest habitat and to a lesser extent by habitat destruction, with an estimated population of 50–300 individuals as of 2015. There is concern that the species may already be extinct, and even if individuals are still alive, extinction has been described as "inevitable" within 10 years from 2025 without intervention.

The saola is the only species in the genus Pseudoryx and the earliest diverging member of the tribe Bovini, placing buffalo and cattle as its closest relatives.

== History of research and taxonomy ==
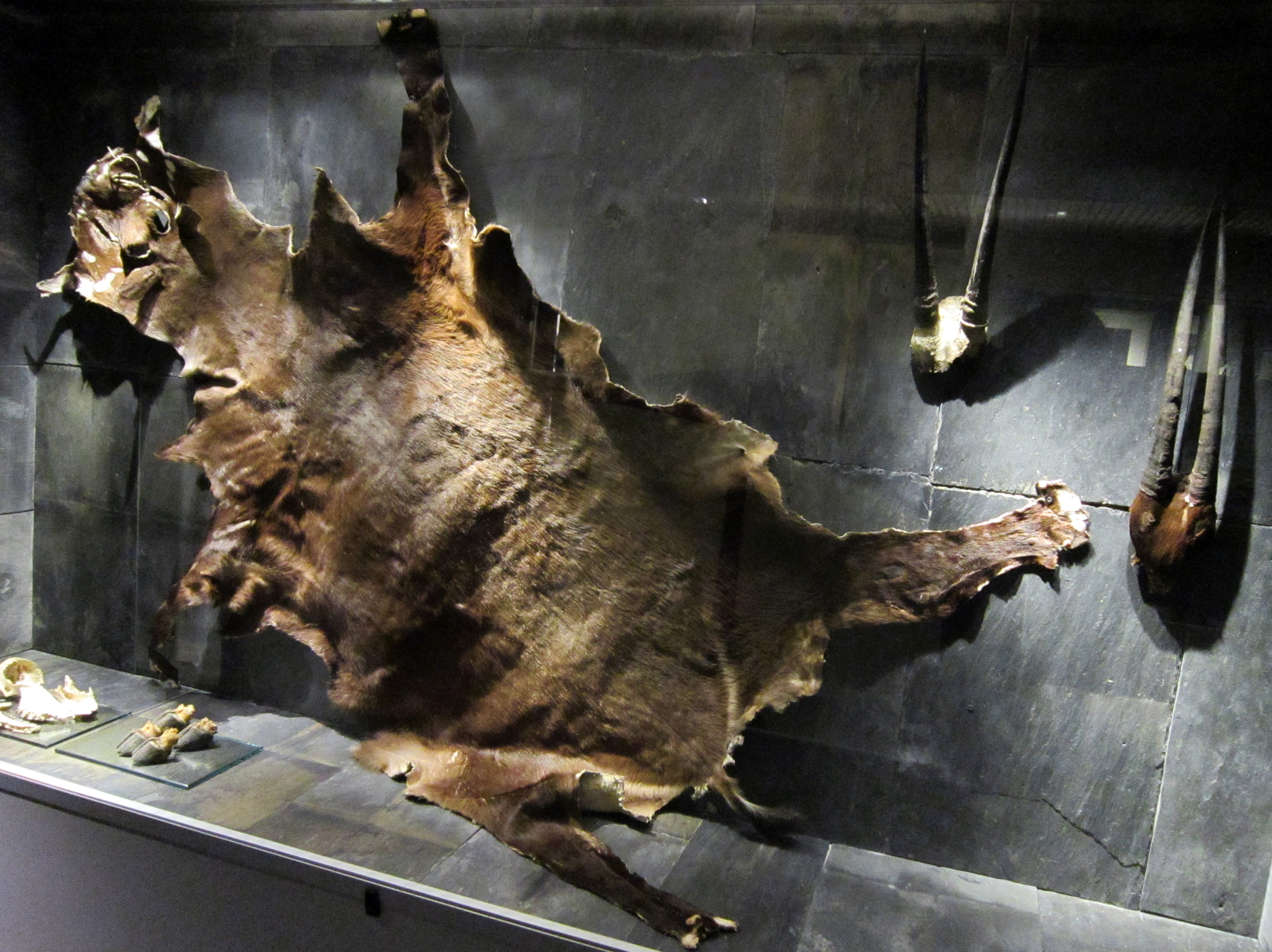
Some of the first known saola remains, Zoological Museum of Copenhagen

In May 1992, the Ministry of Forestry, Vietnam sent a survey team to examine the biodiversity of the newly established Vu Quang National Park. On this team were Do Tuoc, Le Van Cham and Vu Van Dung (of the Forest Inventory and Planning Institute); Nguyen Van Sang (of the Institute of Ecological and Biological Resources); Nguyen Thai Tu (of Vinh University); and John MacKinnon (of the World Wildlife Fund). On 21 May, the team procured a skull featuring a pair of strange, long and pointed horns from a local hunter. They came across a similar pair in the Annamite Range in the northeastern region of the reserve the following day. The team ascribed these features to a new bovid species, calling it the "saola" or the "Vu Quang ox" to avoid confusion with the sympatric serow. The WWF officially announced the discovery of the new species on 17 July 1992.

According to biodiversity specialist Tony Whitten, though Vietnam boasts a variety of flora and fauna, many of which have been recently described, the discovery of as large an animal as the saola was quite unexpected. The saola was the first large mammal to be discovered in the area for 50 years. Observations of live saola have been few and far between, restricted to the Annamite Range.

The scientific name of the saola is Pseudoryx nghetinhensis. It is the sole member of the genus Pseudoryx and is classified under the family Bovidae. The species was first described in 1993 by Vu Van Dung, Do Tuoc, biologists Pham Mong Giao and Nguyen Ngoc Chinh, Peter Arctander of the University of Copenhagen and John MacKinnon. The discovery of saola remains in 1992 generated huge scientific interest due to the animal's special physical traits. The saola differs significantly from all other bovid genera in appearance and morphology, enough to place it in its own genus (Pseudoryx).

Since its physical traits are so complex to classify, Pseudoryx had been classified variously as member of the subfamily Caprinae and as belonging to any of the three tribes of the subfamily Bovinae: Boselaphini, Bovini and Tragelaphini. DNA analysis has led scientists to place the saola as a member of the tribe Bovini, the group which includes buffalo, cattle, bison and yaks, among others. Recent genetic research has placed it as the most primitive and earliest diverging member of the tribe Bovini.

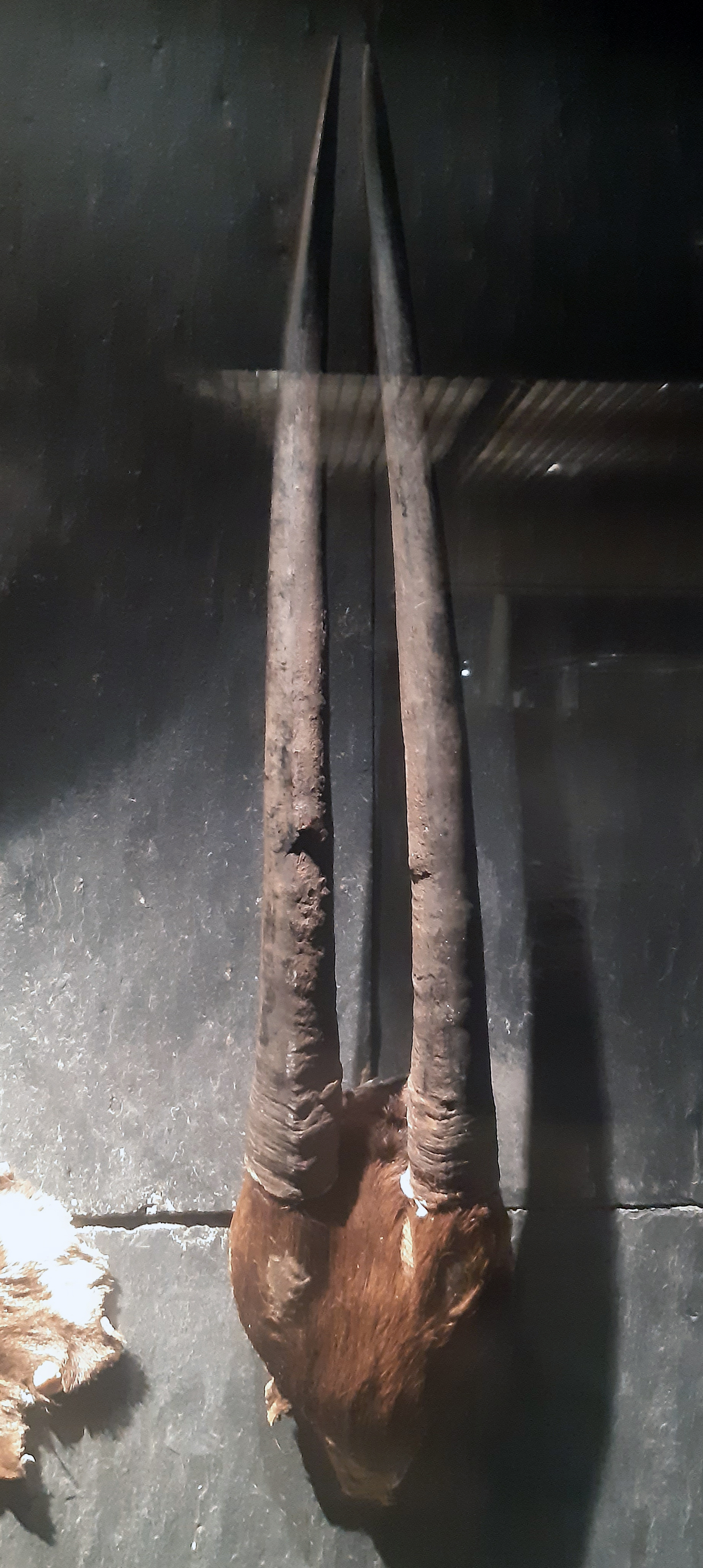
Horns in the University of Copenhagen Zoological Museum

Below is a cladogram based on Yang et al., 2013 and Calamari, 2021:

- - Bovidae
    - Bovinae
      - Bovini
        - Pseudoryx (saola)
        - - Bubalina (true buffalo)
          - Bovina (cattle, bison, yak, etc)
      - - Boselaphini (nilgai and four-horned antelope)
        - Tragelaphini (kudus, nyalas etc.)
    - Aegodontia
      - - Aepycerotinae (impala)
        - Nesotraginae (suni and bates's antelope)
      - - - Antilopinae (gazelles, springbok, dik-dik, royal antelope, saiga, etc.)
          - - Cephalophinae (duikers etc.)
            - Oreotraginae (klipspringer)
        - - Reduncinae (kobs, reedbucks, waterbucks etc.)
          - - Caprinae (chamois, sheep, ibexes, goats, muskox, etc.)
            - - Alcelaphinae (hartebeest, topi, wildebeest etc.)
              - Hippotraginae (sable antelopes, oryxes etc.)

The saola is suggested to have diverged from the ancestor of other members of Bovini between 10.8 and 16.2 million years ago, during the Middle Miocene. A 2021 study suggested that it was closely related to the extinct genus Miotragocerus, known from the late Miocene of Eurasia.

A genomic analysis of historical saola specimens published in 2025 revealed that the saola split into two lines at least 20,000 years ago, but no later than 5,000 years ago, one of which became the northern population in the area of the Vũ Quang National Park, the Pù Mát National Park, both in Vietnam, and the Nakai-Nam-Theun National Park in Laos, and the other became the southern population in the area of Huế, Đông Giang and Tây Giang, all in Vietnam. The separation may have been caused by climatic changes at the end of the last ice age and the associated changes in the landscape and vegetation. This may also have been influenced by the beginning of sedentarisation in the region. This separation was accompanied by a steady reduction in effective population size, with the effective population size suggested to have not have exceeded 5,000 individuals in the last 10,000 years. Within the genome of the respective evolutionary lines, there are areas with a lack of diversity, but these are variably distributed and are therefore not shared by the two populations.

=== Etymology ===
The name 'saola' has been translated as "spindle[-horned]", although the precise meaning is actually "spinning-wheel post horn". The name comes from a Tai language of Vietnam. The meaning is the same in Lao language (ເສົາຫລາ, also spelled ເສົາຫຼາ /sǎo-lǎː/ in Lao). The specific name nghetinhensis refers to the two Vietnamese provinces of Nghệ An and Hà Tĩnh, while Pseudoryx acknowledges the animal's similarities with the Arabian or African oryx. The Hmong people in Laos refer to the animal as saht-supahp, a term derived from Lao (ສັດສຸພາບ /sàt supʰáːp/) meaning "the polite animal", because it moves quietly through the forest. Other names used by minority groups in the saola's range are lagiang (Van Kieu), a ngao (Ta Oi) and xoong xor (Katu) In the press, saolas have been referred to as "Asian unicorns", an appellation apparently due to its rarity and reported gentle nature, and perhaps because both the saola and the oryx have been linked with the unicorn. No known link exists with the Western unicorn myth or the "Chinese unicorn", the qilin.

== Description ==
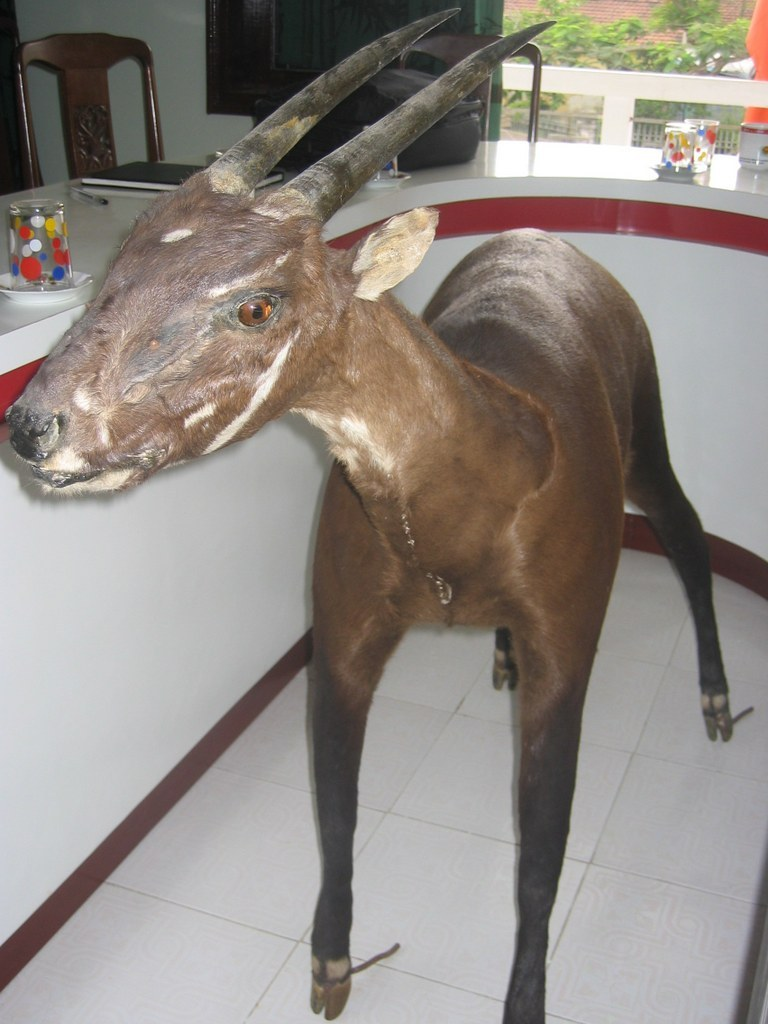
Taxidermy specimen

In a 1998 publication, William G. Robichaud, the coordinator of the Saola Working Group, recorded physical measurements for a captive female saola he dubbed 'Martha', in a Laotian menagerie. She was observed for around 15 days until she died from unknown causes. Robichaud noted the height of the female as 84 cm (33 in) at the shoulder; the back was slightly elevated, nearly 12 cm (4.7 in) taller than the shoulder height. The head-and-body length was recorded as 150 cm (59 in). The general characteristics of the saola, as shown by studies during 1993–5 as well as the 1998 study, include a chocolate brown coat with patches of white on the face, throat and the sides of the neck, a paler shade of brown on the neck and the belly, a black dorsal stripe, and a pair of nearly parallel horns, present on both sexes.

Robichaud noted that the hair, straight and 1.5–2.5 cm (0.59–0.98 in) long, was soft and thin–a feature unusual for an animal that is associated with montane habitats in at least a few parts of its range. While the hair was found to be short on the head and the neck, it thickened to woolly hair on the insides of the forelegs and the belly. Studies before 1998 reported a hint of red in the inspected skins. The neck and the belly are a paler shade of brown compared to the rest of the body. A common observation in all the three aforementioned studies is a 0.5 cm (0.20 in) thick stripe extending from the shoulders to the tail along the middle of the back. The tail, which measured 23 cm (9.1 in) in Robichaud's specimen, is divided into three horizontal bands, brown at the base, black at the tip and white in the middle. Saola skin is 1–2 mm (0.039–0.079 in) thick over most of the body, but thickens to 5 mm (0.20 in) near the nape of the neck and at the upper shoulders. This adaptation is thought to protect against both predators and rivals' horns during fights. Saolas weigh between approximately 80–100 kg (176–220 lbs).

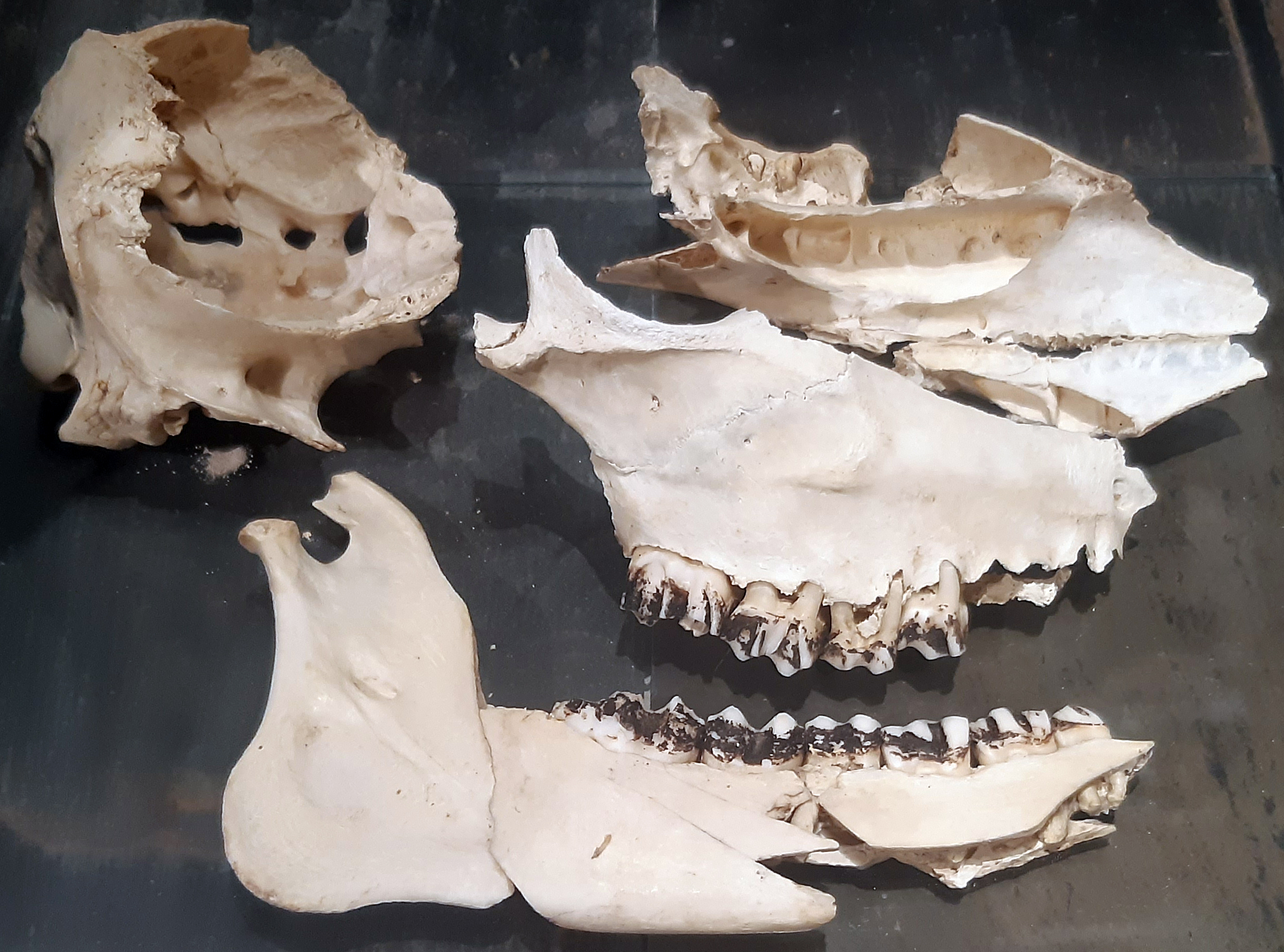
Skull fragments, also in the University of Copenhagen Zoological Museum

The saola has round pupils with dark-brown irises that appear orange when light is shone into them; a cluster of white whiskers about 2 cm (0.79 in) long with a presumably tactile function protrude from the end of the chin. The specimen Robichaud observed could extend its tongue up to 16 cm (6.3 in) and reach its eyes and upper parts of the face; the upper surface of the tongue is covered with fine, backward-pointing barbs. Robichaud observed that either of the two maxillary glands (sinuses) had a nearly rectangular hollow with the dimensions 9×3.5×1.5 cm (3.54×1.38×0.59 in), covered by a 0.8 cm (0.31 in) thick flap. The maxillary glands of the saola are probably the largest among those of all other animals. The glands are covered by a thick, pungent, grayish green, semi-solid secretion beneath which lies a sheath of few flat hairs. Robichaud observed several pores, used probably for secretion, on the upper surface of the lid. Each white facial spot shelters one or more nodules from which originate 2–2.5 cm (0.79–0.98 in) long white or black hairs. These secretions are typically rubbed against the underside of vegetation, leaving a musky, pungent paste. The spoor of the forelegs measured 5–6 cm (2.0–2.4 in) long by 5.3–6.4 cm (2.1–2.5 in) wide, and 6 cm (2.4 in) long by 5.7–6 cm (2.2–2.4 in) for the hindlegs.

Both sexes possess slightly divergent horns that are similar in appearance and form almost the same angle with the skull, but differ in their lengths. Horns resemble the parallel wooden posts locally used to support a spinning wheel (thus the familiar name "spindlehorn"). These are generally dark-brown or black and about 35–50 cm long; twice the length of their head. Studies in 1993 and 1995 gave the maximum distance between the horn tips of wild specimens as 20 cm (7.9 in), but the female observed by Robichaud showed a divergence of 25 cm (9.8 in) between the tips. Robichaud noted that the horns were 7.5 cm (3.0 in) apart at the base. While studies prior to Robichaud's claim the horns are uniformly circular in cross-section, Robichaud observed his specimen had horns with a nearly oval cross-section. The sides of the base of the horns is rugged and indented.

== Distribution and habitat ==
The saola has one of the smallest ranges of any large mammal. It inhabits wet evergreen or deciduous forests in eastern Southeast Asia, preferring river valleys. Sightings have been reported from steep river valleys at 300–1,800 m (980–5,910 ft) above sea level. In Vietnam and Laos, the species' range appears to cover approximately 5,000 km^{2} (1,900 sq mi), including four nature reserves. During the winters, it migrates to the lowlands. In the northern Annamite Mountains, it was sighted mostly near streams at elevations of 592–1,112 m (1,942–3,648 ft).

== Ecology and behaviour ==
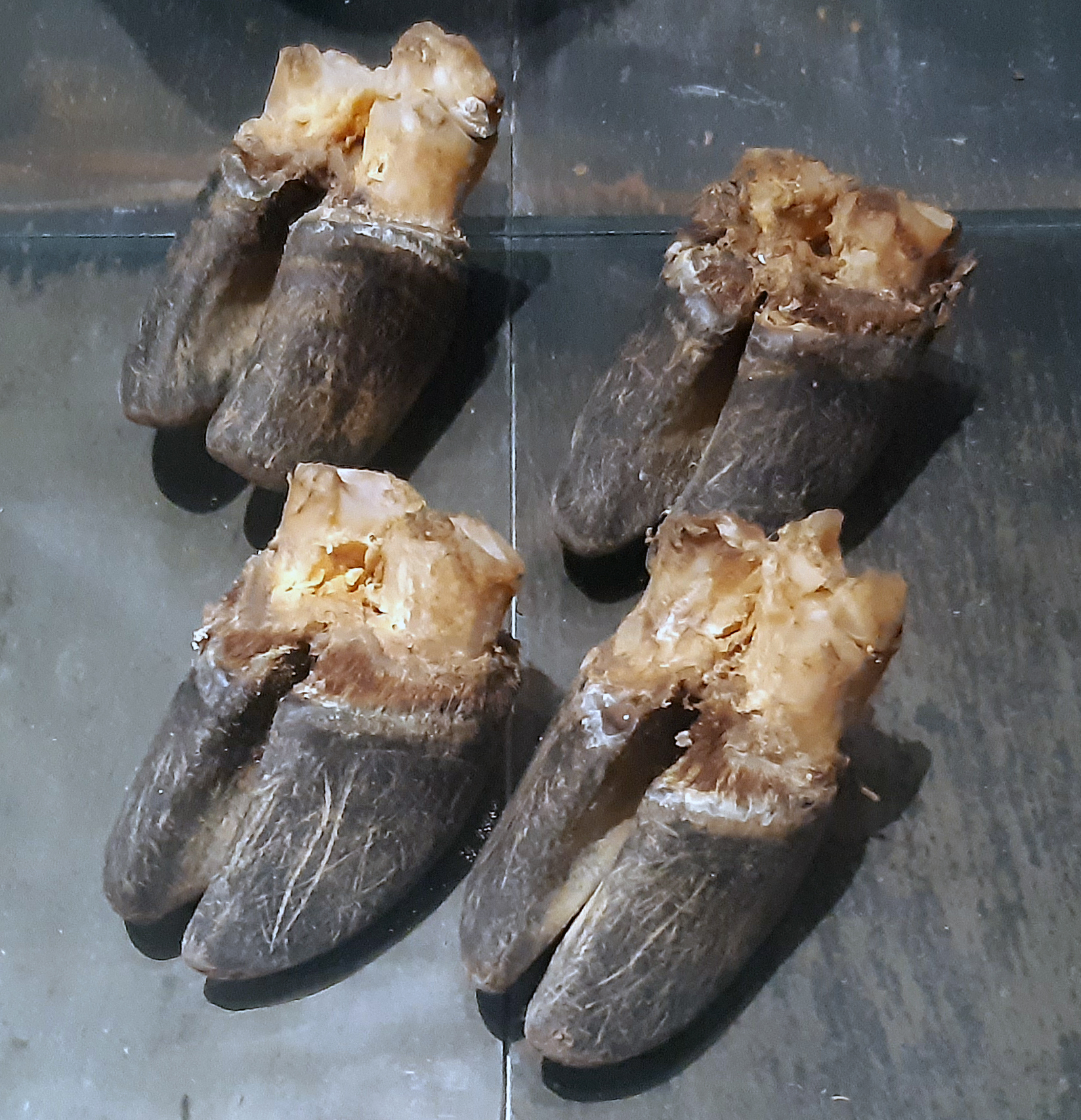
Hooves in the University of Copenhagen Zoological Museum

Local people reported that the saola is active in the day as well as at night, but prefers resting during the hot midday hours. Robichaud noted that the captive female was active mainly during the day, but pointed out that the observation could have been influenced by the unfamiliar surroundings the animal found herself in. When she rested, she would draw her forelegs inward to her belly, extend her neck so that her chin touched the ground, and close her eyes. Though apparently solitary, saola have been reported in groups of two or three as well as up to six or seven. Grouping patterns of the saola resemble those of the Cape bushbuck, anoa and sitatunga.

Robichaud observed that the captive female was calm in the presence of humans, but was afraid of dogs. On an encounter with a dog, she would resort to snorting and thrust her head forward, pointing her horns at her opponent. Her erect ears pointed backward, and she stood stiffly with her back arched. Meanwhile, she hardly paid any attention to her surroundings. This female was found to urinate and defecate separately, dropping her hind legs and lowering her lower body – a common observation among bovids. She would spend considerable time grooming herself with her strong tongue. Marking behaviour in the female involved opening up the flap of the maxillary gland and leaving a pungent secretion on rocks and vegetation. She would give out short bleats occasionally.

=== Diet ===
A captive female saola ate spleenwort (Asplenium), Homalomena and various species of broad-leaved shrubs or trees of the family Sterculiaceae. She fed on all plants and showed a preference for the Sterculiaceae species. She chewed or pulled leaves into her mouth using her long tongue. She fed mainly during the day. The saola is also reputed to feed on Schismatoglottis, unlike other herbivores in its range.

=== Reproduction ===
Very little information is available about the reproductive cycle of the saola. The saola is likely to have a fixed mating season, from late August to mid-November; only single calf births have been documented, mainly during summer between mid-April and late June. In the absence of more specific data, the gestation period has been estimated as similar to that of Tragelaphus species, about 33 weeks. Three reports of saola killings from nearby villagers involved young accompanying mothers. One possessed 9.5 cm (3.7 in) long horns, another an estimated 15 cm (5.9 in), and the third 18.8 cm (7.4 in); these varying horn lengths suggest a birth season extending over at least two to three months.

== Conservation ==
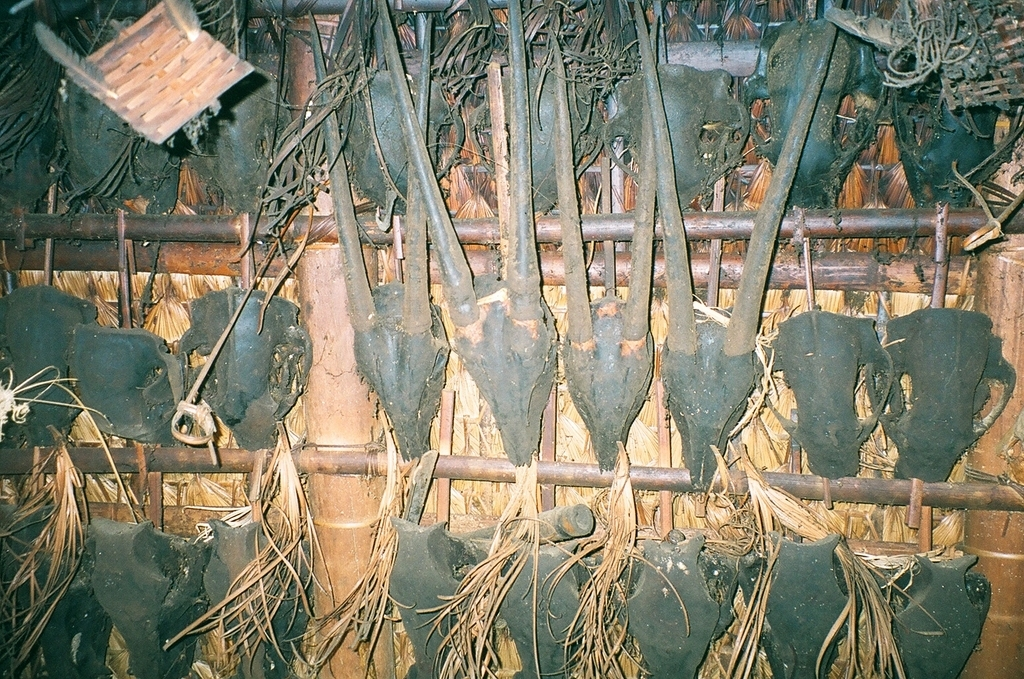
Skulls in Vietnam

The saola is currently considered to be critically endangered. Its restrictive habitat requirements and aversion to human proximity are likely to endanger it through habitat loss and habitat fragmentation. Saola suffer losses through local hunting and the illegal trade in furs, traditional medicines, and for use of the meat in restaurants and food markets. They also sometimes get caught in snares that have been set to catch animals raiding crops, such as wild boar, sambar, and muntjac. More than 26,651 snares have so far been removed from saola habitats by conservation groups.

The key feature of the area occupied by the saola is its remoteness from human disturbance. Saola are shot for their meat, but hunters also gain high esteem in the village for the production of a carcass. Due to the scarcity, the locals place much more value on the saola than more common species. Because the people in this area are traditional hunters, their attitude about killing the saola is hard to change; this makes conservation difficult. The intense interest from the scientific community has actually motivated hunters to capture live specimens. Commercial logging has been stopped in the nature reserve area of Bu Huong, and there is an official ban on forest clearance within the boundaries of the reserve.

Species of conservation concern are frequently hard to study; there are often delays in implementing or identifying necessary conservation needs due to lack of data. Because the species is so rare, there is a continuous lack of adequate data; this is one of the major problems facing saola conservation. Trained scientists have never observed saola in the wild. Unfortunately, because it is unlikely that intact saola populations exist, field surveys to discover these populations are not a conservation priority.

The Saola Working Group was formed by the IUCN Species Survival Commission's Asian Wild Cattle Specialist Group, in 2006 to protect the saolas and their habitat. This coalition includes about 40 experts from the forestry departments of Laos and Vietnam, Vietnam's Institute of Ecology and Biological Resources, Vinh University, biologists and conservationists from Wildlife Conservation Society, and the World Wide Fund for Nature.

The Saola Foundation for Annamite Mountains Conservation, a US-based non-profit organization, specializes in saola conservation. One of the foundation's main projects is locating the remaining individual wild saolas, which have not been officially recorded since 2013. To find the remaining saola individuals, the organization employs specialized search methods across remote habitats, including locally recruited wildlife trackers, scent detection dogs trained to locate ungulate dung, and a rapid field DNA test kit developed with the Wildlife Conservation Society. The foundation coordinates with the IUCN SSC Saola Working Group under the "One Plan Approach". Their goal is to determine if saola can be found and safely captured to establish a captive conservation breeding program, with the intent of future reintroduction into the wild.

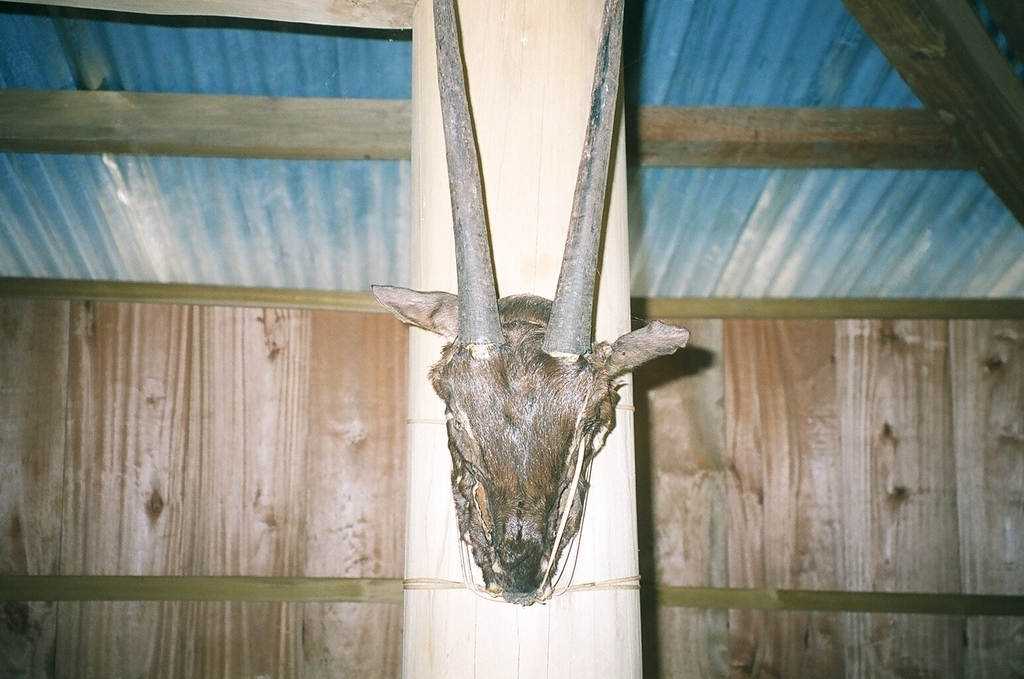
Mounted head in Vietnam

A group of scientists from the Vietnam Academy of Science and Technology in central Hanoi, within the Institute of Biotechnology, investigated a last resort effort of conserving the species by cloning, an extremely difficult approach even in the case of well-understood species. However, the lack of female saola donors of enucleated ovocytes and receptive females, as well as the interspecific barriers, greatly compromise the potential success of the cloning technique.

Researchers have stationed within villages around the Phou Sithon Endangered Species Conservation Area (PST) where saola have been spotted. Based on interviews that were conducted amongst the villagers, they have stated that poachers enter the restricted areas, illegally hunting the last saola. They have stressed the need for more human regulation to be enforced in order to keep the sustainability of wildlife in check.

2017 the Saola Working Group together with the Leibniz Institute for Zoo and Wildlife Research in an open letter to Science called for the establishment of a conservation breeding programme.

As of 2025, a 2013 camera trap recording is the youngest sighting of the species, though a 2021 statistical analysis suggested that there may be a small number of scattered individuals still in existence. Conservationist Rob Timmins stated that in 2025: "I think that few would disagree that extinction [of the Saola] in the next decade will be inevitable (unless intervention is successful)”. That year, an intensive search was undertaken in Laos in order to attempt to find any surviving Saola individuals.

== Culture ==
The mascot of the 2021 Southeast Asian Games is Sao La. This design by Ngô Xuân Khôi defeated 557 other mascot submissions to emerge as the winner of the 2019 searching contest.

== See also ==
- Leaf muntjac (Muntiacus putaoensis)
- Truong Son muntjac (Muntiacus truongsonensis)
- Giant muntjac (Muntiacus vuquangensis)
- Annamite striped rabbit (Nesolagus timminsi)

== Sources ==
- DeBuys, William (2015). The Last Unicorn: A Search for One of Earth's Rarest Creatures. Back Bay Books. ISBN 978-0-316-23287-6.
