= Quang khem =

Unclassified animal

The Quang khem ("slow-running deer") or Chinh's deer is an animal resembling a deer, found in the Pu Mat region of Vietnam, close to Vũ Quang. It first came to scientific attention through the work of biologist Nguyen Ngoc Chinh.

It is curious for its antlers, which, unlike those of other deer, are unpronged, in fact resembling the curled horns of an antelope. Quang khem skulls culled by Nguyen have been sent to University of Copenhagen, where they are being studied by Peter Arctander, who has so far been unable to relate them to any known deer species. As a result, its taxonomic status remains undefined and no binomial name has been assigned yet.
