= Kazi Mobin-Uddin =

American surgeon (1930–1999)

- Born: July 16, 1930; Skindarabad, India
- Died: June 10, 1999 (aged 68); Columbus, Ohio, U.S.
- Education: Jackson Memorial Hospital, Aligarh Muslim University, King Edward Medical College
- Known for: Inferior vena cava filter
- Scientific career
- Fields: Endovascular surgery
- Workplaces: University of Miami, Ohio State University

Kazi Mobin-Uddin (July 16, 1930 – June 10, 1999) was an American surgeon specializing in vascular surgery research.

== Early life and education ==
Mobin-Uddin was born in British India and educated at the Aligarh Muslim University in Aligarh, British India.

== Career ==
In 1969, as a faculty member at the University of Miami, he developed the first inferior vena cava filter for patients with deep vein thrombosis. He published his findings in New England Journal of Medicine and Archives of Surgery. Till then patients with deep vein thrombosis required a high-risk invasive surgical procedure to prevent thrombus embolization to the pulmonary artery.

In its October 20, 1969 issue, Newsweek magazine reported on the discovery, calling it "Umbrella of life." The Mobin-Uddin umbrella was released for general clinical use in 1970.

American College of Chest Physicians has incorporated Inferior vena cava filter into guidelines for management of deep vein thrombosis in their 2012 guidelines. Over 50,000 Inferior vena cava filter are placed in United States each year.
