= Vũ Quang =

- Former Vũ Quang district police headquarters, now in Vũ Quang commune
- Interactive map of Vũ Quang
- Coordinates: 18.38601671385321°N 105.50857791422781°E
- Country: Vietnam
- Region: North Central Coast
- Province: Hà Tĩnh
- Established: 16 June 2025

Area
  - Total: 533.50 km^{2} (205.99 sq mi)

Population (2025)
  - Total: 14,991
  - Density: 28/km^{2} (73/sq mi)

Vũ Quang is a commune in Hà Tĩnh province, Vietnam. It is the largest commune in the province by area.

The area of present-day Vũ Quang commune was formerly part of Vũ Quang district, Hà Tĩnh province.

Vũ Quang commune was established under Resolution No. 1665/NQ-UBTVQH15, issued by the Standing Committee of the National Assembly of Vietnam on 16 June 2025. Under the resolution, the entire area and population of Vũ Quang township, Hương Minh commune, Quang Thọ commune, and Thọ Điền commune were merged to form a new commune named Vũ Quang.
