= CpG island hypermethylation =

Phenomenon

CpG island hypermethylation is a phenomenon that is important for the regulation of gene expression in cancer cells, as an epigenetic control aberration responsible for gene inactivation. Hypermethylation of CpG islands has been described in almost every type of tumor.

Many important cellular pathways, such as DNA repair (hMLH1, for example), cell cycle (p14ARF), apoptosis (DAPK), and cell adherence (CDH1, CDH13), are inactivated by it. Hypermethylation is linked to methyl-binding proteins, DNA methyltransferases and histone deacetylase, but the degree to which this process selectively silences tumor suppressor genes remains a research area. The list for hypermethylated genes is growing.

== History ==
The first discovery of methylation in a CpG island of a tumor suppressor gene in humans was that of the Retinoblastoma (Rb) gene in 1989. This was just a few years after the first oncogene mutation was discovered in a human primary tumor. The discovery of the methylation-associated inactivation of the Von Hippel-Lindau (VHL) gene revived the idea of the hypermethylation of the CpG island promoter being a mechanism to inactivate genes in cancer. Cancer epigenetic silencing in its current state was born in the labs of Baylin and Jones, where it was proven that CpG island hypermethylation was a common inactivation mechanism of the tumor suppressor gene p16INK4a. The introduction of methylation-specific PCR and sodium bisulfite modification added tools to the belt of cancer epigenetics research, and the list of candidate genes with aberrant methylation of their CpG islands has been growing since. Initially, the presence of alterations in the profile of DNA methylation in cancer was seen as a global hypomethylation of the genome that would lead to massive overexpression of oncogenes with a normally hypermethylated CpG island. Lately, this is considered as an incomplete scenario, despite the idea of the genome of the cancer cell undergoing a reduction of its 5-methylcytosine content when compared to its parent normal cell being correct. In normal tissues, the vast majority of CpG islands are completely unmethylated with some exceptions. The association of transcriptional silencing of tumor suppressor genes with hypermethylation is the foundation upon which this subset of cancer epigenetics stands.

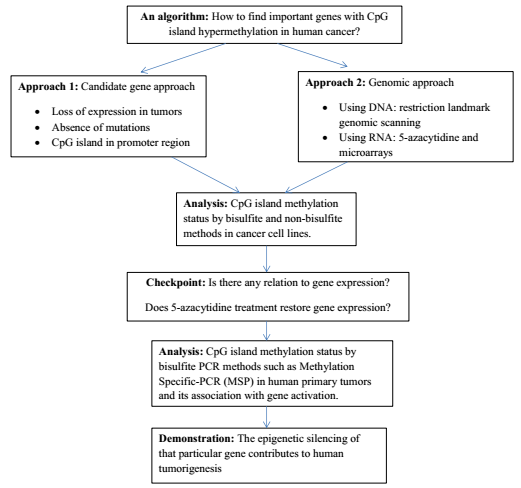
An algorithm to find functional DNA methylation in cancer cells

== Structure ==
In a normal cell, the CpG island is hypomethylated, and the rest of the genome is methylated. It is evident that the hypomethylation of the CpG island in normal cells provides no additional steric hindrance to future binding. The majority of CpG pairs in mammals are chemically modified by the covalent attachment of a methyl group to the C5 position of the cytosine ring. This modification is distributed throughout the genome and represses transcription. A CpG island is a cytosine and guanine linked by a phosphate in a repeated sequence. These are genetic hotspots as they are sites for active methylation. The expression of a gene is tissue specific, which leads to variation in tissue function. Methylation of a gene prevents expression of a gene in a particular way.

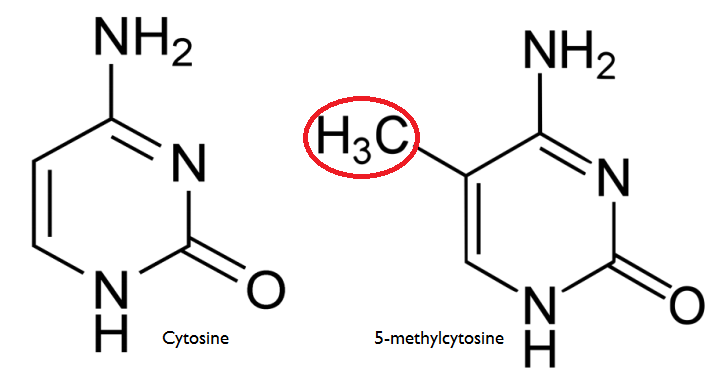
Methylation of cytosine to 5- methylcytosine: DNA methylation is the addition of a methyl group to the DNA that happens at cytosine. The image shows a cytosine single ring base and a methyl group added on to the 5 carbon. In mammals, DNA methylation occurs almost exclusively at cytosine chains that are followed by guanine.

The reason for methylation to be almost exclusive to CpG dinucleotides is the symmetry of the dinucleotide. This allows for preservation during cell division and is a hallmark for epigenetic modifications.

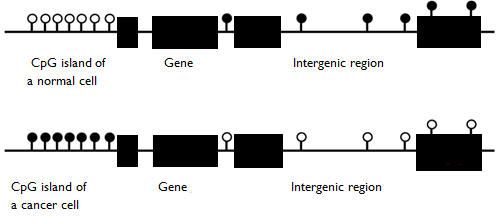
In a normal cell, the CpG island is hypomethylated, as can be seen from the unfilled stubs, but the genome, in general, is methylated, as can be seen from the filled in stubs. In contrast, in the cancer cell, the CpG island is more likely to be methylated, and the rest of the genome is hypomethylated. There is a swap of where DNA methylation is found between a normal cell and a cancer cell.

== Role in cancer ==
CpG islands that are hypermethylated can play three roles in cancer: in diagnosis, prognosis and in monitoring. It is useful to consider a particular tumor type, called CpG island methylator phenotype, or CIMP: higher levels of CpG island hypermethylation are found in CIMP. The frequent occurrence of hypermethylation was first described in colorectal cancer and later for glioma. More recently, it has been studied for neuroblastomas. Colorectal cancer will not necessarily have the same set of hypermethylated CpG islands as in a glioma, and this clinical distinctness of tumors can be interpreted by doctors. Hypermethylated CpG islands also act as biomarkers, as they can help distinguish cancer from normal cells in the same sample.

Colorectal CIMP was one of the first to be described. Patients in this category of cancer tend to be older, female and have a defective MLH1 function. The tumors are usually in the ascending colon. They also have a good prognostic outcome. Clinically distinct phenotypes of CIMP also suggest that there is potential for epigenetic therapy.

In diagnosis, one can identify the tumor type and tumor subtype, as well as its primary tumor when that is unknown. Hypermethylation increases with tumorigenicity, which is an indication of the prognosis of cancer. For example, high methylation is a marker for poor prognosis in lung cancer. CpG island hypermethylation shows promise for molecular monitoring of patients with cancer, and is also a potential target for therapeutic use.

Epigenetic alterations in tumor progression: Epigenetic mistakes are clinically relevant is because they progress over time. The image starts with normal tissue and progresses all the way to metastasis. The global level of methylation decreases as one progresses from normal tissue to metastatic tissue. However, methylation at some CpG islands increases in density. One might be able to use these methylation markers to detect whether a tissue is cancerous or metastatic.

Aberrations in epigenetic control that are seen in cancer pertain to DNA methylation, which can be either locus-specific DNA hypermethylation or genome-wide DNA hypomethylation. Under locus-specific DNA hypermethylation comes CpG island hypermethylation. DNA methylation acts as an alternative to genetic mutation. According to the Knudson hypothesis, cancer is a result of multiple hits to DNA, and DNA methylation can be one such hit. Epigenetic mutations such as DNA methylation are mitotically heritable, but also reversible, unlike gene mutations. The identity of hypermethylated CpG islands varies by the type of tumor. Some single gene examples include MLH1 in colorectal cancer and BRCA1 in breast cancer.
