= Inflammatory fibroid polyp =

- Other names: IFP, Eosinophilic granulomatous polyp, Vanek's tumor.
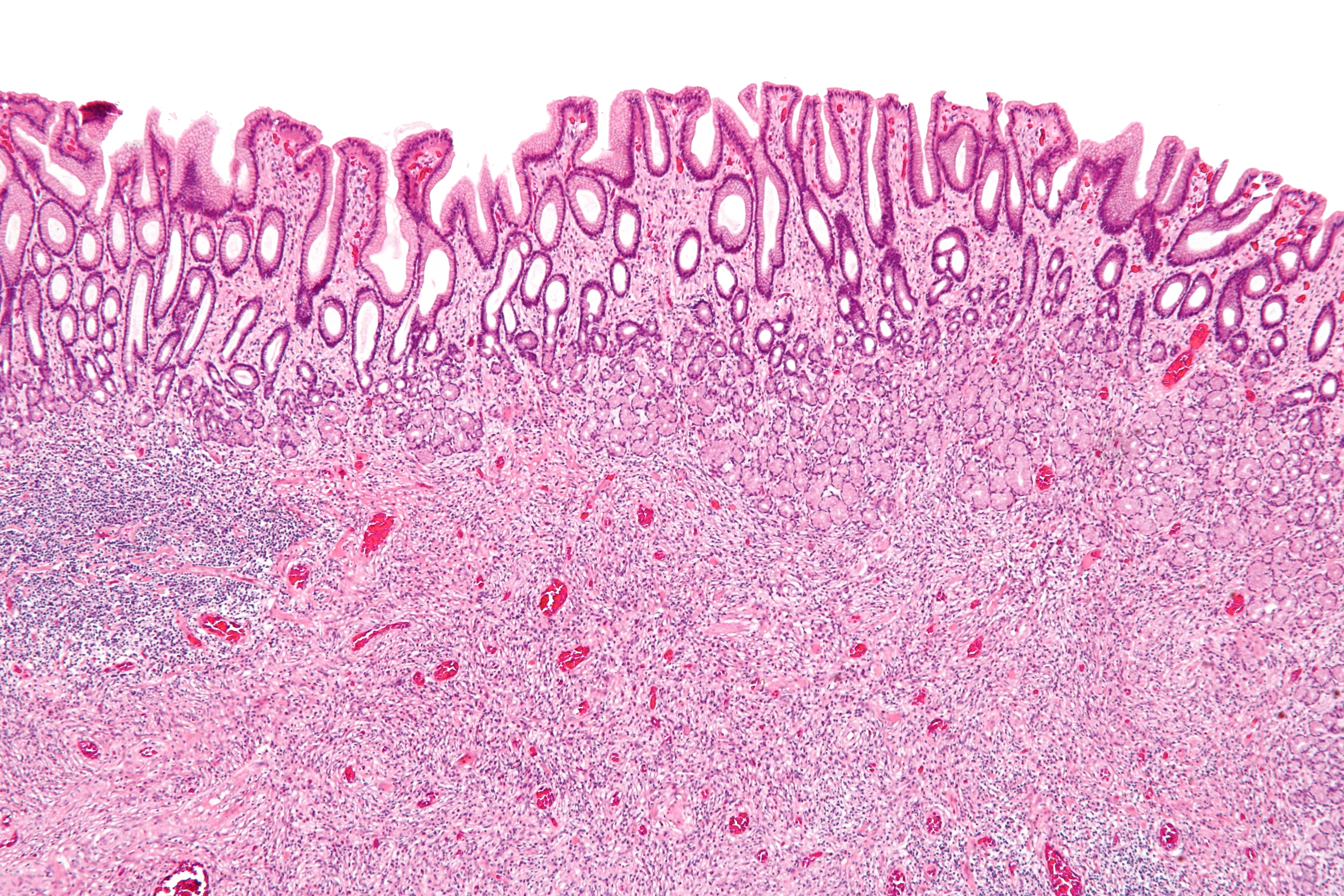
- Low magnification micrograph of an inflammatory fibroid polyp. H&E stain.
- Specialty: Gastroenterology

An inflammatory fibroid polyp (IFP) is an uncommon digestive system tumor. J. Vanek initially identified it as a separate pathological entity in 1949 when he reported six case reports of eosinophilic infiltration in gastric submucosal granulomas. It is a single, non-encapsulated polypoid lesion that is typically submucosal. It is characterized by a large number of small blood vessels, oedematous connective tissue, and an inflammatory eosinophilic infiltrate.

Inflammatory fibroid polyp has also been referred to as polypoid myo-endothelioma, fibroma with eosinophilic infiltration, inflammatory pseudotumour, myxoma, haemangiopericytoma, eosinophilic granuloma, Vanek's tumour, and gastric eosinophilic submucosal granuloma.

When the lesions are symptomatic, they typically measure less than 3 cm in size and are linked to symptoms such as iron deficiency anemia, bleeding, weight loss, and dyspeptic symptoms. Significant complications like obstruction, intussusception, and even hypovolemic shock can result from larger lesions.

== Signs and symptoms ==
The tumor's size, location, and complications will affect how it presents itself. Common symptoms include epigastric pain and bleeding in the stomach and intestinal symptoms. When it is in the esophagus, symptoms such as bleeding, gastroesophageal reflux, and dysphagia may occur.

Although the inflammatory fibroid polyp's natural history is unknown, it has been known to grow quickly, within a few months, and to reach sizes of up to 20 cm.

=== Complications ===
Inflammatory fibroid polyps emerge from the submucosa and pierce the lamina propria, causing the mucosal layer to bulge. On rare occasions, they may develop ulcers through the mucosa, resulting in bleeding and symptoms similar to hypovolemic shock.

== Causes ==
The inflammatory fibroid polyp is a benign lesion whose cause is unknown; some reports attribute its genesis to myofibroblasts, while others propose vascular or perivascular tissue. It is widely acknowledged that this is a reactive process to chemical, physical, or microbiological stimuli rather than a neoplasm. In the past, it was believed that the etiology was caused by an inflammatory reaction to an underlying granuloma. An irritating stimulus is frequently linked to the development of a submucosal granuloma (such as trauma, tuberculosis, helicobacter pylori, Crohn's disease, or sarcoidosis).

Parasites have also been implicated as a potential cause of inflammatory fibroid polyps.

There have been suggestions that a factor that has not yet been identified may cause hyperplasia of vessels and stromal cells, leading to localized vascular inflammation.

=== Risk factors ===
The inflammatory fibroid polyp may be connected to neoplastic and neoplastic GI lesions occurring simultaneously or synchronously, but the literature does not support a causal relationship. Isolated reports have been made of inflammatory fibroid polyps at different locations coexisting with granular cell tumors and certain immune system conditions, such as neurofibromatosis, Crohn's disease, ankylosing spondylitis, and human immunodeficiency virus infection, however, these results are inconsistent and most likely coincidental.

=== Genetics ===
Inflammatory fibroid polyps have demonstrated a higher incidence in individuals with a family history of gastrointestinal polyps. Activating mutations in the platelet-derived growth factor receptor alpha (PDGFRA) gene were found in 70% of cases in a genetic study involving inflammatory fibroid polyps.

== Diagnosis ==
Over 90% of gastrointestinal polyps found during routine endoscopic examination are present in patients who are asymptomatic and do not appear to be cancerous. By using a gross examination alone, these polyps cannot be identified from those that need additional treatment. Consequently, to identify the type of polyp and whether underlying dysplasia is present, histological analysis is always recommended. To accurately determine the type of polyp, additional diagnostic techniques such as tandem biopsies, immunohistochemistry staining, and endoscopic ultrasound (EUS) may also be required.

An inflammatory fibroid polyp presents histologically as an exuberant, non-encapsulated, localized proliferation of spindle-shaped mononuclear cells, with an inflammatory infiltrate that is frequently dominated by eosinophils. The fuzzy borders visible on endoscopic ultrasound correspond with the non-encapsulated proliferating spindle cells. Most inflammatory fibroid polyps are vascular, consisting of a network of varying diameter blood vessels. Occasionally, the spindle-shaped cells are arranged in a concentric pattern that resembles "onion skin". Surface ulceration in focal areas can occasionally be observed. Though usually polypoidal, the lesion is thought to originate in the lower layer of the lamina propria and may be sessile. The layers of the muscle wall atrophy, fraying, and splitting are brought on by inflammatory fibroid polyps.

When inflammatory fibroid polyps from different GI sites are stained with immunohistochemistry, the spindle cell component exhibits nearly 100% positivity for vimentin and CD34, but varying staining for smooth muscle actin, HHF-35, KP1, and Mac 387.

=== Classification ===
The literature describes four histopathological groups into which inflammatory fibroid polyps can be divided: classical fibrovascular, nodular, sclerotic, and edematous.

== Treatment ==
The only available treatment option is surgical excision of the lesion using either an open or endoscopic approach, depending on the location and size of the tumor. In certain instances, a formal oesophagectomy or lateral oesophagotomy was required for resection. Moreover, reports of using Nd YAG laser and thermocautery to treat tiny polyps exist.

== Epidemiology ==
Individuals who have inflammatory fibroid polyps usually show up in their fifth or seventh decade of life. In children, it is uncommon. Even though the female-to-male ratio has varied from 2.8:1 to 0.7:1, both sexes seem to be equally affected.

== See also ==
- Inflammatory pseudotumor
- Inflammatory myofibroblastic tumour
