= RNF43 =

Protein-coding gene in the species Homo sapiens

Identifiers
- Aliases: RNF43, RNF124, URCC, ring finger protein 43, SSPCS
- External IDs: OMIM: 612482; MGI: 2442609; GeneCards: RNF43
Available structures
| PDB | Ortholog search: PDBe RCSB |
| PDB | List of PDB id codes 4KNG |
Enzyme activity
| EC # | BRENDA | ExPASy | KEGG | MetaCyc |
|---|---|---|---|---|
| 2.3.2.27 | ↗ | ↗ | ↗ | ↗ |

Gene location (Human)
| Chr. | Chromosome 17 (human) |
| Band | 17q22 | Start | 58,353,676 bp |
| Band | 17q22 | End | 58,417,595 bp |

Gene location (Mouse)
| Chr. | Chromosome 11 (mouse) |
| Band | 11|11 C | Start | 87,553,548 bp |
| Band | 11|11 C | End | 87,626,365 bp |
RNA expression pattern
| Bgee | Human / Mouse (ortholog); Top expressed in: rectum; gingival epithelium; mucosa of sigmoid colon; mucosa of transverse colon; duodenum; parotid gland; jejunal mucosa; epithelium of colon; right adrenal cortex; gonad / Top expressed in: saccule; thin ascending limb of loop of Henle; ectoderm; otic vesicle; otic placode; genital tubercle; duodenum; female urethra; crypt of lieberkuhn of small intestine; zygote; More reference expression data |
| BioGPS | n/a |
Gene ontology
| Molecular function | metal ion binding; protein binding; frizzled binding; ubiquitin protein ligase activity; ubiquitin-protein transferase activity; transferase activity |
| Cellular component | integral component of membrane; plasma membrane; integral component of plasma membrane; nuclear envelope; endoplasmic reticulum membrane; nucleus; endoplasmic reticulum; membrane |
| Biological process | negative regulation of Wnt signaling pathway; Wnt signaling pathway; Wnt receptor catabolic process; protein ubiquitination; stem cell proliferation; ubiquitin-dependent protein catabolic process; multicellular organism development |
Sources:Amigo / QuickGO
Orthologs
| Databases | NCBI: entry; OMA: entry |
| Species | Human | Mouse |
| Entrez | 54894 | 207742 |
| Ensembl | ENSG00000108375 | ENSMUSG00000034177 |
| UniProt | Q68DV7 | Q5NCP0 |
| RefSeq (mRNA) | NM_001305544; NM_001305545; NM_017763 | NM_172448; NM_001363437 |
| RefSeq (protein) | NP_001292473; NP_001292474; NP_060233 | NP_766036; NP_001350366 |
| Location (UCSC) | Chr 17: 58.35 – 58.42 Mb | Chr 11: 87.55 – 87.63 Mb |
| PubMed search |
- Wikidata
| View/Edit Human | View/Edit Mouse |

Ring finger protein 43 is a protein that in humans is encoded by the RNF43 gene.

== Function ==
The protein encoded by this gene is a RING-type E3 ubiquitin ligase and is predicted to contain a transmembrane domain, a protease-associated domain, an ectodomain, and a cytoplasmic RING domain. This protein is thought to negatively regulate Wnt signaling, and expression of this gene results in an increase in ubiquitination of frizzled receptors, an alteration in their subcellular distribution, resulting in reduced surface levels of these receptors. Alternative splicing results in multiple transcript variants encoding different isoforms. [provided by RefSeq, Mar 2015]. A nuclear function for the protein has also been proposed but recently it was shown that this is an artifact, nuclear staining being an artifact of the antibodies employed. Cancer-associated RNF43 mutations lead to activation of β-catenin signaling through aberrantly increasing Wnt-receptor levels at the membrane. Importantly, inactivating N-terminal RNF43 mutations render cancer cells sensitive to Wnt antagonists, but mutations elsewhere do not.
