= Vũ Quang district =

Coordinates: 18°17′30″N 105°24′30″E

Vũ Quang district Huyện Vũ Quang
- District
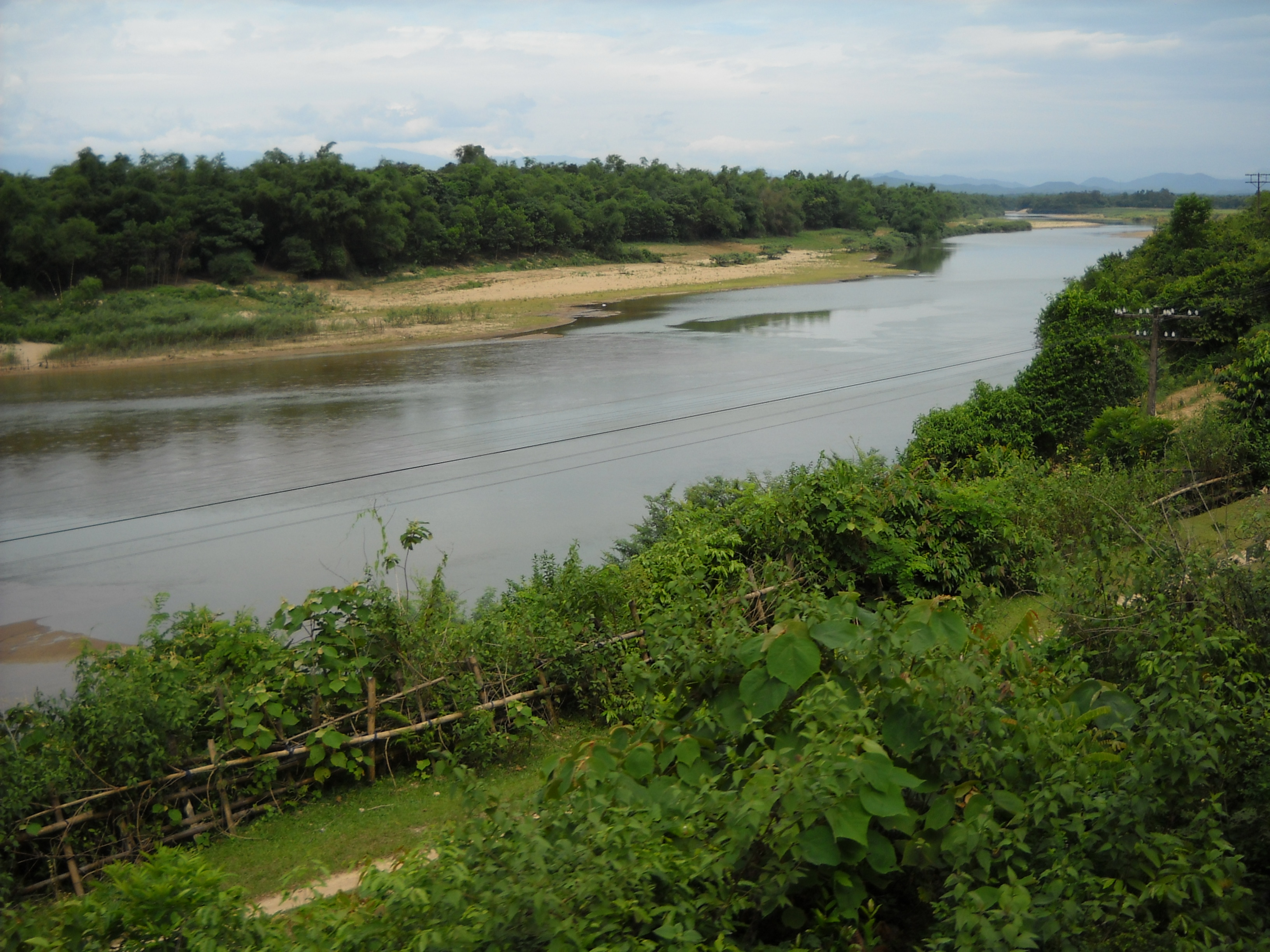
- Ngan Sau river, section passing Vu Quang, Ha Tinh
- Interactive map of Vũ Quang district
- Country: Vietnam
- Region: North Central Coast
- Province: Hà Tĩnh
- Capital: Vũ Quang

Area
  - Total: 249 sq mi (646 km^{2})

Population (2003)
  - Total: 32,242
- Time zone: UTC+7 (Indochina Time)

Vũ Quang is a former rural district of Hà Tĩnh province in the North Central Coast region of Vietnam. As of 2003 the district had a population of 32,242. The district covers an area of 646 km^{2} (249 sq mi). The district capital lies at Vũ Quang.

== Geography ==
Vũ Quang is an area of steep mountains and dense tropical forest in Hà Tĩnh province of Vietnam's North Central Coast. It is a very wet, hot area, whose mountains trap moisture coming in from the South China Sea. This creates a very stable but inhospitable climate. It rains continually in the rainy season, and in the dry season there is much fog; consequently most surfaces are algae-coated and slippery. The local hunters prefer to stay out of the forest, setting snares and using dogs to chase animals into more accessible areas.

== History ==
Vũ Quang was used as a base by Phan Đình Phùng, the anti-colonial revolutionary, from 1885 to 1896.

== See also ==
- Vũ Quang National Park
