= Vascular snare =

Endovascular device

- Specialty: Interventional radiology

A vascular snare is an endovascular device that is used to remove foreign bodies from inside arteries and veins. The snare consists of several radiopaque loops of wire inside a catheter, which when extended flower out, and which collapse when withdrawn into the catheter.

== Uses ==
Vascular snares are used to retrieve inferior vena cava filters, lost guide wires, or broken central venous catheters.

Vascular snaring is a component technique in endovascular aneurysm repair in some devices.

== Technique ==
A snare catheter is inserted using the Seldinger technique under fluoroscopic guidance. The snare wire is advanced under direct visualization and flowered open. The object being retrieved is captured within the loops of snare, and retrieved with the snare wire and catheter, being carried out of the body at the tip of the catheter.
