= 1950 in science =

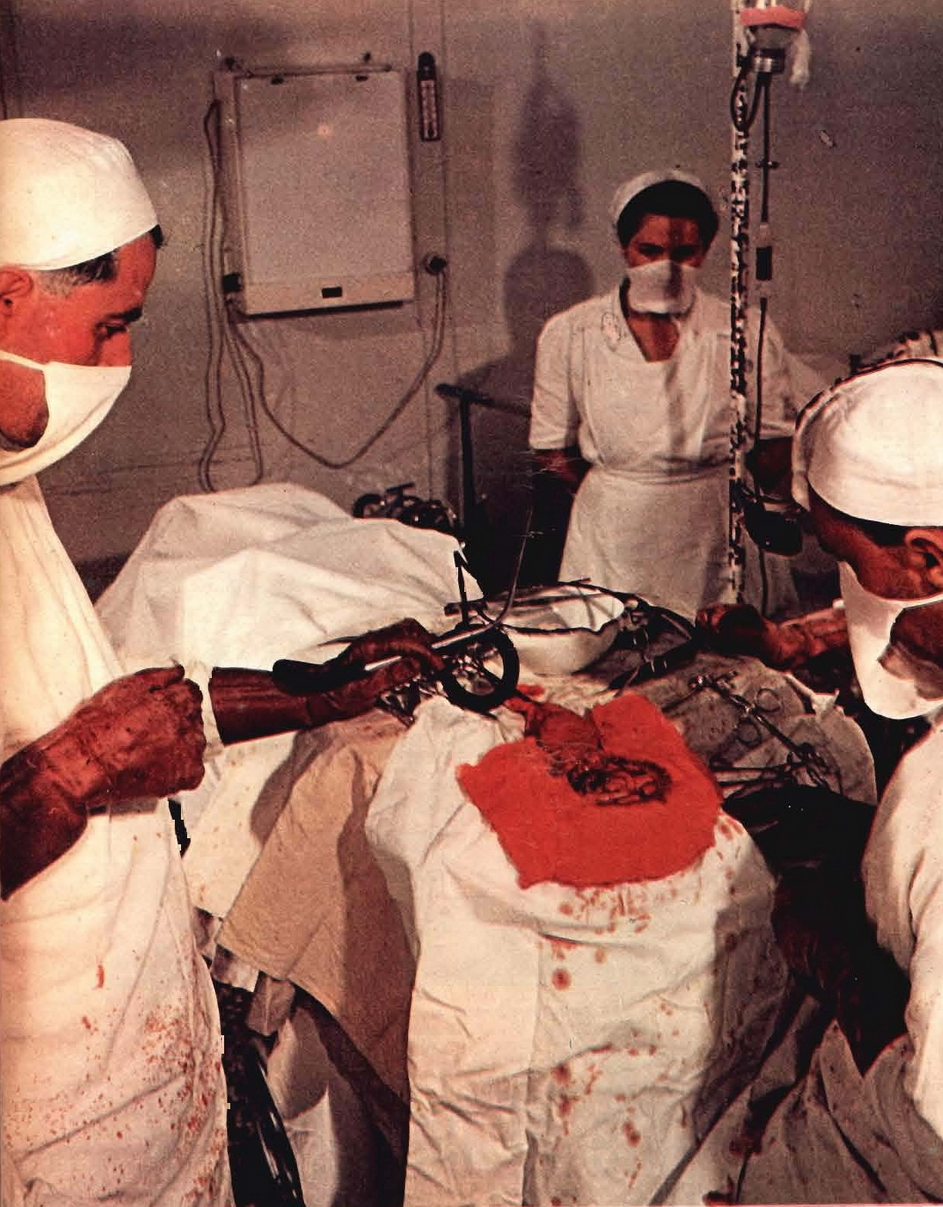
Operating room in Milan in 1950

The year 1950 in science and technology included some significant events around the world that are listed below.

== Astronomy and Space Sciences ==
- Dutch astronomer Jan Oort postulates the existence of an orbiting cloud of planets (the Oort cloud) at the outermost edge of the Solar System.
- Enrico Fermi discusses the Fermi paradox.

== Biology ==
- Melvin Calvin, James Bassham, and Andrew Benson at the University of California, Berkeley, discover the Calvin cycle in photosynthesis.
- Entomologist Willi Hennig publishes Grundzüge einer Theorie der phylogenetischen Systematik in East Germany, pioneering the study of cladistics.
- Full-scale release of myxomatosis for control of the Australian rabbit population.

== Chemistry ==
- February 9 – Californium, a radioactive actinide transuranium element, is first synthesized by Stanley G. Thompson, Kenneth Street Jr., Albert Ghiorso and Glenn T. Seaborg at the University of California, Berkeley.

== Computer science ==
- March – Publication of Claude Shannon's paper "Programming a Computer for Playing Chess", seminal in the development of computer chess and introducing the Shannon number.
- April – Publication of Richard Hamming's paper "Error detecting and error correcting codes", seminal in the construction of error detection and correction codes and from which Hamming code and the Hamming distance derive.
- August 25 – In the early history of video games, Bertie the Brain is first displayed to the public at the Canadian National Exhibition.
- October – Publication of Alan Turing's paper "Computing Machinery and Intelligence", seminal in the study of artificial intelligence and presenting the Turing test.

== Mathematics ==
- John Forbes Nash Jr. proposes the Nash equilibrium in game theory, initially in his Princeton doctoral thesis.
- The prisoner's dilemma is framed by Merrill Flood and Melvin Dresher at RAND and formalized and named by Albert W. Tucker.

== Medicine ==
- June 17 – The first cadaveric internal kidney transplantation is performed on Ruth Tucker, a 44-year-old woman with polycystic kidney disease, at Little Company of Mary Hospital (Evergreen Park), Illinois. Although the donated kidney is rejected 10 months later because no effective immunosuppressive drugs have been developed at this time, the intervening time gives Tucker's remaining kidney time to recover and she lives another 5 years.
- October – Australian-born British thoracic surgeon Norman Barrett describes the condition which will become known as Barrett's oesophagus.
- November – Eugene Roberts and Sam Frankel of Washington University School of Medicine report their discovery that GABA (gamma-aminobutyric acid) is produced from glutamic acid and accumulates in the mammalian central nervous system, using newly developed techniques of chromatography to analyze protein-free extracts of mammalian brain.
- December 11 – The typical antipsychotic Chlorpromazine is first synthesized.
- Antihistamine discovered.
- The Duffy antigen is identified in a multiply-transfused hemophiliac patient.
- An external artificial pacemaker is developed by John A. Hopps in conjunction with Wilfred Gordon Bigelow at Toronto General Hospital.

== Physics ==
- July – Oleg Lavrentiev outlines the concept of the tokamak.
- John Ward derives the Ward–Takahashi identity in quantum field theory.

== Technology ==
- October 11 – A field-sequential color system developed by Hungarian American engineer Dr. Peter Goldmark becomes the first color television system to be adopted for commercial use (by CBS in the United States), but is abandoned a year later.
- Canadians Harry Wasylyk, Larry Hansen and Frank Plomp introduce the plastic bin bag for garbage collection.
- First practical pager, developed and manufactured by the Reevesound Company, is introduced for physicians in the New York City area.

== Events ==
- August 12 – In his encyclical Humani generis, Pope Pius XII declares evolution to be a serious hypothesis that does not contradict essential Roman Catholic teachings.
- J. Z. Young delivers the BBC Reith Lectures on Doubt and Certainty in Science, introducing the radio audience to current developments in neurophysiology.

== Awards ==
- Fields Prize in Mathematics (first postwar award): Laurent Schwartz and Atle Selberg
- Nobel Prizes
  - Physics – Cecil Frank Powell
  - Chemistry – Otto Paul Hermann Diels, Kurt Alder
  - Medicine – Edward Calvin Kendall, Tadeus Reichstein, Philip Showalter Hench

== Births ==
- March 2 – James W. Pennebaker, American social psychologist.
- March 5 – Henry Marsh, English neurosurgeon.
- March 18 – Linda Partridge, English biogerontologist.
- May 3 – Kensō Soai, Japanese organic chemist, Nobel Prize in Chemistry 2026.
- May 16 – Georg Bednorz, German physicist, Nobel Prize in Physics 1987.
- June 8 – Stanley J. Korsmeyer (died 2005), American cell biologist.
- July 4 – Steven Sasson, American electrical engineer.
- October 21 – Ronald McNair (died on mission 1986), African American physicist and astronaut.
- November 1 – Robert B. Laughlin, American physicist, Nobel Prize in Physics 1998.
- November 3 – James Rothman, American cell biologist, Nobel Prize in Physiology or Medicine 2013.
- November 22 – Eva-Maria Neher, née Ruhr, German biochemist.
- December 13 – Julia Slingo, English meteorologist.
- December 27 – Joe Armstrong (died 2019), English computer scientist.
- December 28 – Frank Kelly, British mathematician.

== Deaths ==
- February 25 – George Minot (born 1885), American physician, Nobel Prize in Physiology or Medicine 1934.
- March – John Ryle (born 1889), English physician and epidemiologist.
- April 1 – Charles R. Drew (born 1904), African American physician, pioneer in blood transfusion.
- April 28 – Oakes Ames (born 1874), American botanist.
- September 10 – Annie Montague Alexander (born 1867), American paleontologist.
- September 21 – Arthur Milne (born 1896), English space physicist.
- December 11 – Leslie Comrie (born 1893), New Zealand astronomer and computing pioneer.
