= Endoscopic submucosal dissection =

- Specialty: Gastroenterology

Endoscopic submucosal dissection (ESD) is an advanced surgical procedure using endoscopy to remove gastrointestinal tumors that have not entered the muscle layer. ESD may be done in the esophagus, stomach or colon. Application of endoscopic resection (ER) to gastrointestinal (GI) neoplasms is limited to lesions with no risk of nodal metastasis. Either polypectomy or endoscopic mucosal resection (EMR) is beneficial for patients because of its low level of invasiveness. However, to ensure the curative potential of these treatment modalities, accurate histopathologic assessment of the resected specimens is essential because the depth of invasion and lymphovascular infiltration of the tumor is associated with considerable risk for lymph node metastasis. For accurate assessment of the appropriateness of the therapy, en bloc resection is more desirable than piecemeal resection. For a reliable en bloc resection of GI neoplasms, a new method of ER called endoscopic submucosal dissection (ESD) has been developed.

== Development of ESD ==
The ESD technique has developed from one of the EMR techniques, namely endoscopic resection after local injection of a solution of hypertonic saline-epinephrine (ERHSE). Initially, the ESD technique was called by various names such as cutting EMR, exfoliating EMR, EMR with circumferential incision etc. However, a new name was proposed to this technique in 2003, as a treatment positioned between EMR and laparoscopic surgery, since this technique is innovative and enables complete resection of neoplasms that were impossible to resect en bloc by EMR.

At present, numerous electrosurgical knives such as insulation-tipped diathermic knife (IT-knife)–, needle knife, hook knife, flex knife–, triangle-tipped knife, flush knife, mucosectomy, splash needle and a special device called a small-caliber tip transparent (ST) hood are available for this technique. One or two of these electrosurgical knives are used in combination with a high frequency electrosurgical current (HFEC) generator with an automatically controlled system). New types of endoscopes are available for ESD, such as an endoscope with a water jet system, an endoscope with a multi-bending system to facilitate the ESD procedure–. As another approach to successful ESD, investigations of submucosal injection solutions have been actively done. It was reported that a hyaluronic acid solution makes a better long-lasting submucosal cushion without tissue damage than other available solutions,–. As a further improvement of hyaluronic acid solution, usefulness of a mixture of high-molecular-weight hyaluronic acid, glycerin, and sugar has also been reported,.

ESD is characterized by three steps: injecting fluid into the submucosa to elevate the lesion from the muscle layer, circumferential cutting of the surrounding mucosa of the lesion, and subsequent dissection of the connective tissue of the submucosa beneath the lesion. The major advantages of this technique in comparison with polypectomy or EMR are as follows. The resected size and shape can be controlled, en bloc resection is possible even in a large neoplasm, and neoplasms with submucosal fibrosis are also resectable. So this technique can be applied to the resection of complex neoplasms such as large neoplasms, ulcerative non-lifting neoplasms, and recurrent neoplasms. The disadvantages of this technique are the requirement of two or more assistants, it is time-consuming, there is a higher risk of bleeding and perforation than EMR. In Japan, ESD is now gaining acceptance as the standard endoscopic resection technique for stomach neoplasms in an early stage, especially for large or ulcerative neoplasms. Recently, the ESD technique is applied to esophageal or colorectal neoplasms in some institutions, although it is still controversial considering the technical difficulty, associated risks, and favorable outcomes by EMR.

== Sources ==
- Kakushima, Naomi; Fujishiro, Mitsuhiro (2008). "Endoscopic submucosal dissection for gastrointestinal neoplasms". World Journal of Gastroenterology. 14 (19): 2962–7. doi:10.3748/wjg.14.2962. PMC 2712159. PMID 18494043.
