= Colonic polypectomy =

Removal of colorectal polyps to prevent them turning cancerous

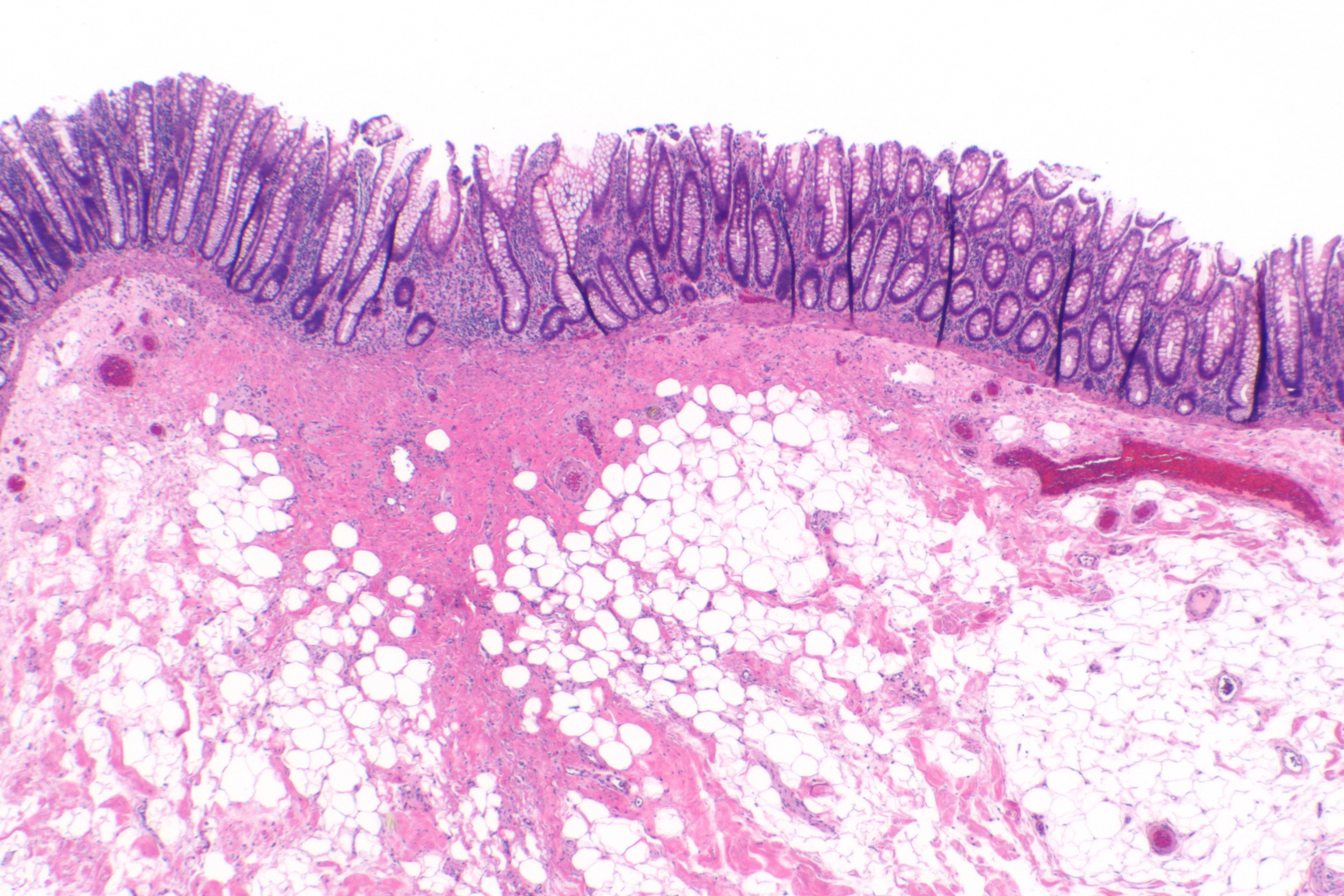
- Micrograph showing a colorectal polypectomy scar. H&E stain.
- Specialty: Gastroenterology
- Uses: Removal of colorectal polyps
- Complications: bleeding, perforation, Postpolypectomy coagulation syndrome
- Approach: Cold forceps, cold snare, hot snare, endoscopic mucosal resection (EMR), endoscopic submucosal dissection (ESD)

Colonic polypectomy is the removal of colorectal polyps in order to prevent them from turning cancerous.

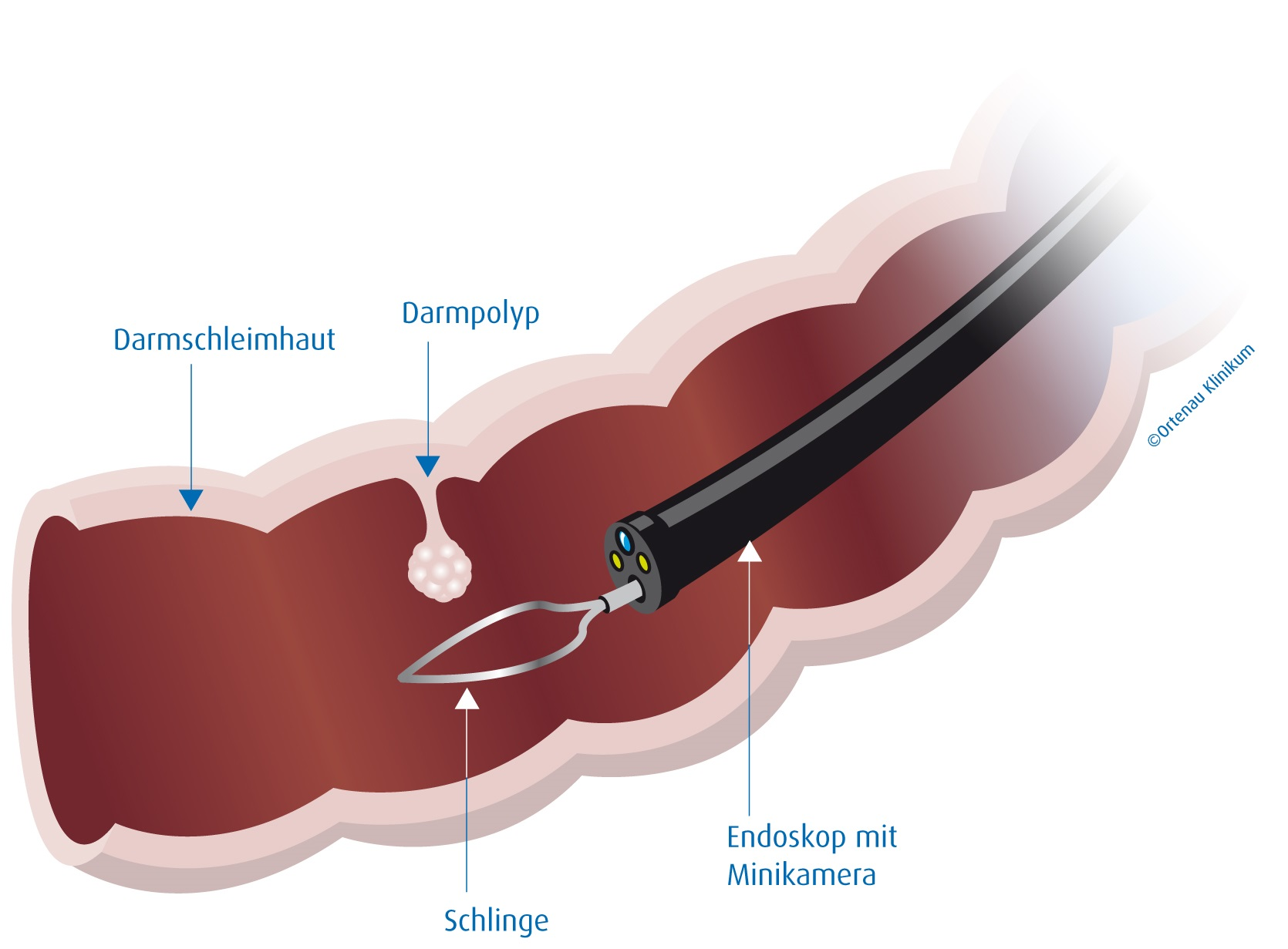
Method of removing a polyp with a snare

Gastrointestinal polyps can be removed endoscopically through colonoscopy or esophagogastroduodenoscopy, or surgically if the polyp is too large to be removed endoscopically. The method used to perform colonic polypectomies during colonoscopy depends on the size, shape and histological type of the polyp to be removed. Prior to performing polypectomy, polyps can be biopsied and examined histologically to determine the need to perform polypectomy.

== Evaluation ==
Prior to resection, assessment of the polyp should include: polyp size, morphology, location, and accessibility. If there are features that suggest cancer is present in the polyp, then either endoscopic submucosal dissection or surgery should be considered. If the polyp appears benign, but the risk of progression to cancer is negligible, then resection is not necessary.

== Larger, sessile polyps ==
Large sessile polyps are more difficult to remove endoscopically, and polypectomy in these cases has a higher risk of complication. Sessile polyps up to 10mm can often be removed by snare polypectomy. Polyps over 10mm may have to be removed piecemeal by snare polypectomy. The use of electrocautery over a large area has a significant risk of causing colonic perforation; to reduce this chance, and to facilitate the polypectomy, sterile fluid (saline or colloid, with methylene blue dye added) can be injected under the base of the polyp to raise it away from the muscular layers of the colon.

== Larger, pedunculated polyps ==
Pedunculated polyps can be removed by snare polypectomy. When the polyp is identified, a polypectomy snare is passed over the polyp and around the stalk of the polyp. The loop of the snare is then tightened to grip the polyp stalk, and the polyp is pulled away from the wall of the colon. An electric current is then passed through the snare loop to cut through the polyp stalk, providing electrocautery at the same time. The polyp can then be retrieved using the snare or an endoscopy basket, and removed by withdrawing the colonoscope.

== Technique ==
Polyps may be removed using cold biopsy forceps, cold snare polypectomy, hot biopsy forceps, hot snare polypectomy, endoscopic mucosal resection, or endoscopic submucosal dissection. Cold biopsy forceps may be used for small (diminutive) polyps 1-3 mm in size. Cold snare polypectomy has the advantage of avoiding the risk of delayed bleeding, postpolypectomy coagulation syndrome, and perforation.

== Complications ==
The most common complications of colonic polypectomy are bleeding and colonic perforation. Rarely, postpolypectomy coagulation syndrome may occur following removal of large polyps with electrocautery.
