= Naohisa Yahagi =

Japanese physician and endoscopist

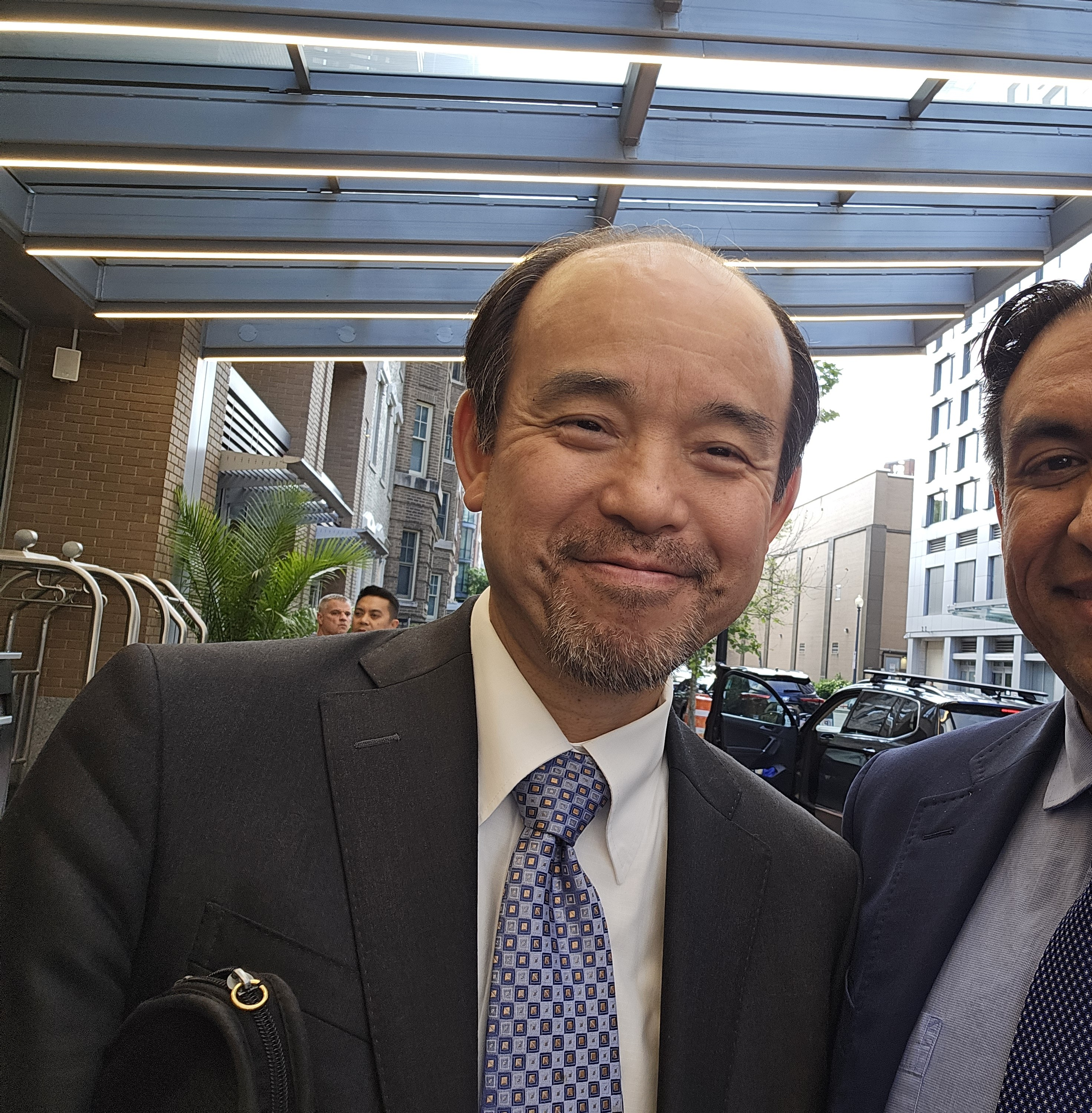
- Education: Niigata University (MD); University of Tokyo (PhD)
- Occupations: Professor of Medicine; Physician; Researcher
- Employer: Keio University School of Medicine
- Known for: endoscopic submucosal dissection (ESD)

Naohisa Yahagi is a Japanese physician and endoscopist who serves as Professor of Medicine and Director of the Division of Research and Development for Minimally Invasive Treatment at the Cancer Center, Keio University School of Medicine in Tokyo. He is known for contributions to the development of a technique termed endoscopic submucosal dissection, used for resection of polyps and early stage cancers of the gastrointestinal tract.

== Education and career ==
Yahagi received an M.D. from Niigata University School of Medicine in 1987. He completed residency in internal medicine at Tokyo Teishin Hospital in 1989, then served as a staff gastroenterologist there from 1989 to 1990. In 1990 he joined the First Department of Internal Medicine at the University of Tokyo and later became an assistant professor in 1997. He earned a Ph.D. from the University of Tokyo in 1998. From 2005 to 2010 he served as Director of the Department of Gastroenterology and the Digestive Endoscopy Unit at Toranomon Hospital in Tokyo. In 2010 he moved to Keio University School of Medicine, where he is Professor of Medicine and Director of the Division of Research and Development for Minimally Invasive Treatment at the Cancer Center. He served as President of the 108th Congress of the Japan Gastroenterological Endoscopy Society at Japan Digestive Disease Week 2024 in Kobe.

== Research and contributions ==
In 2004 Yahagi and colleagues reported an early technique of endoscopic submucosal dissection (ESD) for early gastric cancer using the tip of an electrosurgical snare, which influenced later ESD practice. He later authored an editorial on the development of colorectal ESD, reflecting ongoing contributions to indications, technique and dissemination. Yahagi is a co-author of the Japan Gastroenterological Endoscopy Society guidelines for colorectal ESD and EMR, including editions published in 2015 and 2020.

Yahagi and collaborators developed the DualKnife as an improved version of the Flex knife for ESD, and described its use in clinical practice. Subsequent device iterations such as DualKnife J have been reported by the manufacturer for combined injection and dissection during ESD procedures. According to Stanford’s Center for Asian Health, Yahagi has been described as an inventor of several ESD devices, including the Flex knife and DualKnife series, as well as a developer of the water pressure method and string clip suturing method.

Yahagi and colleagues introduced the water pressure method for ESD in 2017, reporting improved visualization and countertraction under water immersion, with subsequent publications evaluating its application in anatomically challenging locations such as the cervical esophagus. He and co-authors also described the string clip suturing method in 2016, followed by pilot studies assessing its feasibility for defect closure after ESD.

== Achievements and honors ==
Yahagi served as President of the 108th Congress of the Japan Gastroenterological Endoscopy Society during Japan Digestive Disease Week 2024 in Kobe. He has been invited to lecture and perform live demonstrations at numerous international meetings in endoscopy.
