= Non-lifting sign =

The non-lifting sign is a finding on endoscopic examination that provides information on the suitability of large flat or sessile colorectal polyps for polypectomy by endoscopic mucosal resection (EMR). When fluid is injected under a polyp in preparation for endoscopic mucosal resection, some polyps do not "lift", indicating that the polyp is not separating from the submucosa. This makes polypectomy more technically difficult, and increases the risk of intestinal perforation if polypectomy is then attempted. It is also thought to be indicative of an early colorectal cancer that has invaded the submucosa significantly (sm3 – invasion down to the lower one-third of the submucosa), which would make surgical removal of the tumour preferable to allow complete removal of the cancer. Consequently, the non-lifting sign is generally considered to be a contraindication to performing endoscopic mucosal resection.

== History ==
The non-lifting sign was first described in 1994 by Yoshiharu Uno and Akihiro Munakata of the Hirosaki University School of Medicine, Japan.

In 1999 the same team showed that the presence of a non-lifting sign correlated with the depth of invasion of the submucosa by early colorectal cancers that were being considered for endoscopic resection. The tumours which did lift when fluid was injected were found to be less invasive than those that did not (sm1 or sm2 - invasion confined to the upper two-thirds of the submucosa, with at least 1mm of uninvolved submucosa underneath). It is thought that the non-lifting sign is due to fibrosis around the tumour causing tethering of the tumour to the muscularis mucosae.

Subsequent research suggested that the non-lifting sign is less accurate in determining depth of tumour invasion than the assessment of tumours by the endoscopist, but still suggests that the presence of the sign makes endoscopic resection technically difficult. However, more recently it has been found that fibrosis may be caused when a tumour is biopsied before endoscopic mucosal resection is attempted, which leads to a false positive non-lifting sign and therefore reduces the apparent accuracy of the sign. The authors, therefore, recommended avoidance of biopsy of the lesions if EMR is to be attempted, and if biopsies have been taken the time before EMR is attempted should be minimised.
