= Reptin =

Reptin is a tumor repressor protein that is a member of the ATPases Associated with various cellular Activities (AAA+) helicase family and regulates KAI1. Desumoylation of reptin alters the repressive function of reptin and its association with HDAC1. The sumoylation status of reptin modulates the invasive activity of cancer cells with metastatic potential. Reptin was reported in 2010 to be a good marker for metastasis. Another name for reptin, RuvB-like 2 (RUVBL2 or RVL2) comes from its similarity to RuvB, an ATP-dependent helicase found in bacteria. Reptin is highly conserved, being found in yeast, drosophila, and humans. It presents itself as a member of a number of different protein complexes, most of which function in chromatin modification, including PRC1, TIP60/NuA4 and INO80. Hence, it also has the names INO80J, TIP48, and TIP49B. In the majority of its functions, reptin is paired with a very similar protein, pontin (RUVBL1).

== Structure ==
Human reptin is composed of 463 amino acids. It has ATPase regions, a DNA binding region, and regions for binding to other reptin proteins to form a hexamer ring as well as pontin and other proteins. The reptin hexamer is bound to a pontin hexamer in most, but not all of the complexes that contain reptin. The DNA binding regions are in the hole at the center of the hexamer rings, where, as with other helicases, the DNA can be fed through to separate the strands by using energy stored in the ATP bound to ATPase domains of the helicase proteins. It is not known if reptin hexamers have a wide enough opening to accommodate double stranded DNA; however, reptin-pontin dodecamers are large enough for double stranded DNA to pass through, while pontin hexamers are only large enough to accommodate single stranded DNA.

== Functions ==
Reptin is involved in a very wide range of cell processes, which can vary from species to species.

=== Cancer related functions ===
Reptin coordinates with a number of proteins that are involved in cancer and cancer suppression. These include Telomerase, P53, and HINT1. Telomerase is a protein complex with telomerase reverse transcriptase (TERT), an RNA component (TERC), dyskerin, which binds TERC, reptin, pontin, and a number of other proteins, and both reptin and pontin have been shown to be key factors in telomerase assembly and activity. Telomerase is an important factor in cancer because it allows cancer cells to divide indefinitely without cutting into and destroying their genomes, so reptin promotes cancer in this case.

The inhibition of p53 by reptin occurs by the binding of reptin and AGR2 to the p53 tetramer-forming domain. About half of all human cancer types have p53 inactivated, as p53 functions to prevent cancer and kill cancer cells in a number of ways. Hint1 is a tumor suppressing protein that counteracts cancer by inhibiting TCF-β-catenin complex function. This complex enhances transcription of specific genes, including Wnt1 and the metastasis-associated protein KAI1, and thereby causes cancer growth. This is accomplished when Hint1 binds to reptin, which breaks up the β-catenin complex, suppressing transcription. This complex differs from complexes such as INO80 and NuA4 in that reptin acts against the function of pontin, which promotes transcriptional activity by β-catenin.

=== DNA repair ===
Reptin is a component of both the INO80 and the TIP60/NuA4 protein complexes, which function in repairing DNA double-stranded breaks. Such breaks may lead to cancer and other issues. Researchers have found that reptin is highly important in several functions of both of these complexes. The INO80 complex has been shown to directly participate in both the homologous recombination and the non-homologous end joining processes for fixing double stranded breaks. In addition, it removes histones from the broken DNA to allow repair systems access. Human INO80 also activates genes that resume replication fork action when the replication fork stops at a double stranded break, and it is likely involved in the process directly as well. It has been shown that, in the absence of INO80, there are significantly more double stranded breaks during replication.

Reptin is a component of the NuA4 protein complex, which recruits and assists DNA double stranded break repair systems via the acetylation of histones H4 and H2A. Both reptin and pontin are essential for the acetylation function and the structural formation of the NuA4 complex. The repair stimulated by NuA4 is by homologous recombination.

=== Developmental regulation ===
Improper expression of developmental genes such as Wnt may contribute to cancer; however, expression of developmental genes is also vital to proper development. The involvement of reptin in regulating the Wnt pathway makes it important to the many processes that Wnt guides. Through its role as part of chromatin modification complexes, reptin helps regulate gene expression by altering the packing of DNA, which can block transcription, realign transcription factors to activate or inhibit gene expression, and perform various other regulatory tasks. Reptin's role in the β-catenin complex is highly important to the regulation of transcription.

Reptin also is a component of the polycomb repressive complex 1 (PRC1), where it assists regulation of polycomb group proteins (PcG). In turn, PcG proteins regulate chromatin structure to turn Hox genes on and off, thereby regulating the development of an organism. Reptin can have varying effects on PcG repression. For example, in drosophila, reptin mutations affected multiple sex comb genes with varying intensity, but for certain PRC1-associated sex comb genes reptin mutations had no connection to their expression. Generally, reptin and pontin have opposite effects on Hox and PcG gene expression.

=== Miscellaneous functions ===
In addition to those functions listed above, reptin is also used in a surprising range and number of other cellular activities. In Chlamydomonas reinhardtii, reptin was shown to be an indirect key factor in inducing flagellar repair. In addition, reptin directly participates in zebrafish kidney cilia motility by binding to LrrC6 in the complex for forming dynein arms in the cilia. Reptin also plays a part in the synthesis of small nucleolar ribonucleoproteins (snoRNP) which process non-messenger RNAs.

Reptin participates in apoptosis signaling by binding to the ATPase p400 (SWI2/domino) which interacts with an apoptosis signal cascade. This event occurs in the NuA4 protein complex.

One more function of reptin is its interaction with heat shock protein 90 (HSP90), where it forms the complex, R2TP. This complex functions mainly in processing snoRNA and assembling RNA polymerase II (RNAP II).
