= Postpolypectomy coagulation syndrome =

- Other names: Transmural burn syndrome, Postpolypectomy syndrome Coagulation syndrome
- Specialty: Gastroenterology
- Symptoms: Abdominal pain, fever
- Usual onset: 1-5 days after polypectomy
- Causes: Polypectomy during colonoscopy
- Risk factors: Hypertension, right colon polypectomy, large polyp size (>2 cm), non-polypoid lesions (laterally spreading lesions)
- Differential diagnosis: Perforation
- Prevention: Antibiotic prophylaxis
- Treatment: IV fluids, antibiotics, nothing by mouth
- Prognosis: Excellent
- Frequency: 1%

Postpolypectomy coagulation syndrome (Postpolypectomy syndrome or PPCS) is a condition that occurs following colonoscopy with electrocautery polypectomy, which results in a burn injury to the wall of the gastrointestinal tract. The condition results in abdominal pain, fever, elevated white blood cell count and elevated serum C-reactive protein.

== Signs and symptoms ==
PPCS causes abdominal pain and fever. The condition usually onsets within 1–5 days after colonoscopy with polypectomy using electrocautery. Physical examination may show evidence of peritonitis.

== Etiology ==
PPCS is caused by an electrocautery-induced injury to the wall of the colon that occurs during removal of colon polyps. PPCS occurs when the electric current extends beyond the mucosa, entering the muscularis propria and serosa, resulting in a full thickness (transmural) burn injury. The transmural burn results in localized inflammation of the peritoneum (peritonitis).

== Diagnosis ==
PPCS may resemble perforation. Recognition of PPCS is important, since treatment usually does not require surgery, unlike gastrointestinal perforation. Laboratory studies may show elevated white blood cell count (leukocytosis) and elevated inflammatory markers such as C-reactive protein. CT scan of the abdomen may show severe mural thickening, without air present outside the gastrointestinal tract.

== Treatment ==
Treatment of PPCS consists of intravenous fluids, antibiotics, and avoiding any oral intake of food, water, etc. until symptoms improve.

== Prevention ==
Some low quality evidence suggests that antibiotic prophylaxis may prevent PPCS.

== Epidemiology ==
PPCS occurs about 1% of cases following polypectomy with electrocautery. Risk factors for PPCS include right colon polypectomy, large polyp size (>2 cm), non-polypoid lesions (laterally spreading lesions), and hypertension.
