= AGR2 =

Protein-coding gene in the species Homo sapiens

Identifiers
- Aliases: AGR2, AG2, GOB-4, HAG-2, HEL-S-116, PDIA17, XAG-2, anterior gradient 2, protein disulphide isomerase family member, AG-2, HPC8
- External IDs: OMIM: 606358; MGI: 1344405; GeneCards: AGR2
Available structures
PDB	Ortholog search: PDBe RCSB
PDB	List of PDB id codes 2LNS, 2LNT

Gene location (Human)
Chr.	Chromosome 7 (human)
Band	7p21.1	Start	16,791,811 bp
Band	7p21.1	End	16,833,433 bp

Gene location (Mouse)
Chr.	Chromosome 12 (mouse)
Band	12|12 A3	Start	36,042,906 bp
Band	12|12 A3	End	36,054,086 bp
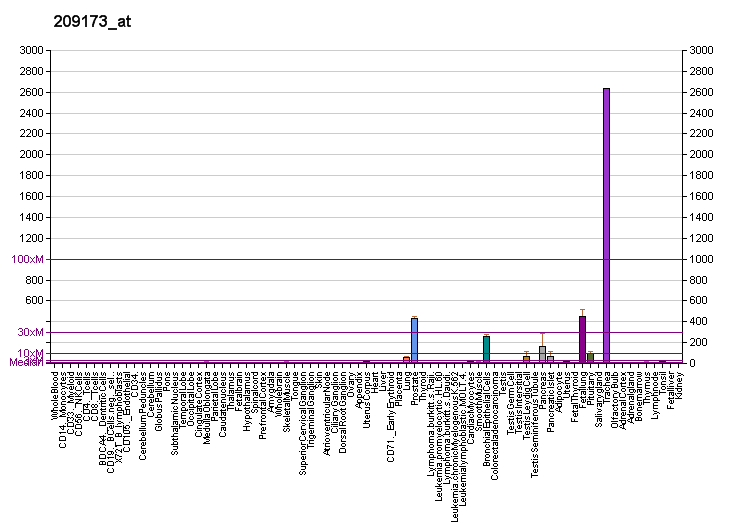
RNA expression pattern
Bgee	Human / Mouse (ortholog); Top expressed in: mucosa of sigmoid colon; pylorus; nasal epithelium; rectum; bronchial epithelial cell; palpebral conjunctiva; mucosa of transverse colon; corpus epididymis; right uterine tube; olfactory zone of nasal mucosa / Top expressed in: pyloric antrum; Ileal epithelium; gastric mucosa; mucous cell of stomach; epithelium of stomach; left colon; olfactory epithelium; Paneth cell; duodenum; lacrimal gland; More reference expression data
BioGPS	More reference expression data
Gene ontology
Molecular function	epidermal growth factor receptor binding; protein binding; protein homodimerization activity; dystroglycan binding
Cellular component	extracellular region; endoplasmic reticulum; extracellular space
Biological process	positive regulation of PERK-mediated unfolded protein response; response to endoplasmic reticulum stress; positive regulation of IRE1-mediated unfolded protein response; positive regulation of gene expression; positive regulation of developmental growth; negative regulation of cell death; positive regulation of epidermal growth factor receptor signaling pathway; lung goblet cell differentiation; digestive tract morphogenesis; mucus secretion; positive regulation of cell-substrate adhesion; cell differentiation; positive regulation of protein localization to plasma membrane
Sources:Amigo / QuickGO
Orthologs
Databases	NCBI: entry; OMA: entry
Species	Human	Mouse
Entrez	10551	23795
Ensembl	ENSG00000106541	ENSMUSG00000020581
UniProt	O95994	O88312
RefSeq (mRNA)	NM_006408	NM_011783
RefSeq (protein)	NP_006399	NP_035913
Location (UCSC)	Chr 7: 16.79 – 16.83 Mb	Chr 12: 36.04 – 36.05 Mb
PubMed search
- Wikidata
View/Edit Human	View/Edit Mouse

Anterior gradient protein 2 homolog (AGR-2), also known as secreted cement gland protein XAG-2 homolog, is a protein that in humans is encoded by the AGR2 gene. Anterior gradient homolog 2 was originally discovered in Xenopus laevis. In Xenopus AGR2 plays a role in cement gland differentiation, but in human cancer cell lines high levels of AGR2 correlate with downregulation of the p53 response, cell migration, and cell transformation. However, there have been other observations that AGR2 can repress growth and proliferation.

== Discovery in Xenopus laevis ==
The Xenopus laevis anterior gradient genes - XAG-1, XAG-2, and XAG-3 - were discovered through dissection of different-aged embryos. They become expressed in the anterior region of the dorsal ectoderm in late gastrula embryos. XAG-2 expression gathers at the anterior region of the dorsal ectoderm, and this region corresponds to the cement gland anlage. Many other homologous proteins have been discovered afterwards in Xenopus.

== Tissue distribution ==
AGR2 is the human homolog of XAG-2. It is expressed strongly in tissues that secrete mucus or function as endocrine organs, including the lungs, stomach, colon, prostate and small intestine. Its protein expression has been shown to be regulated by both androgens and estrogens.

== Structure and function ==
AGR2 is a protein disulfide isomerase, with a single CXXS active domain motif for oxidation and reduction reactions. AGR2 forms mixed disulfides in substrates, such as intestinal mucin. AGR2 interacts with Mucin 2 through its thioredoxin-like domain forming a heterodisulfide bond with cysteine residues in MUC2. AGR2 is suggested to play a role in protein folding, and it has a KTEL C-terminal motif similar to KDEL and KVEL endoplasmic reticulum retention sequences.

== Clinical significance ==
Agr2 is located on chromosome 7p21, a region that has frequent genetic alterations. It was first identified in estrogen receptor-positive breast cancer cells. Later studies showed elevated levels of AGR2 in adenocarcinomas of the esophagus, pancreas, and prostate. In Barrett's esophagus, Agr2 expression is elevated by over 70 times compared to normal esophageal epithelia. Thus, this protein alone is enough to distinguish Barrett's esophagus, which is linked to esophageal adenocarcinoma, from a normal esophagus.

Varying AGR2 levels exist in different cancers. In breast cancer, high AGR2 expression is correlated with low survival rate. AGR2 levels are elevated in the preneoplastic tissue Barrett's oesophagus. AGR2 is also associated with prostate cancer, though lower levels are associated with higher Gleason grades.

In contrast to upregulation of AGR2 in various cancers, downregulation of AGR2 is linked with inflammatory bowel disease and increases in the risk of Crohn's disease and ulcerative colitis. This implies the importance of AGR2 in maintaining epithelial barrier function, which is supported by FOXA1 and FOXA2 molecules (transcription factors for epithelial goblet cells) which can activate the AGR2 promoter.

=== Breast cancer ===
In breast cancer, AGR2 and estrogen (ER) expression are positively correlated. Approximately 70% of breast cancer patients have breast cancer cells that heavily express ER and progesterone receptors (PgR). These patients are normally treated with endocrine therapy. Tamoxifen, which blocks the binding of estradiol to its receptor, is the standard treatment for ER-positive breast cancer. However, about one third of patients do not respond to this therapy, and increased AGR2 may be one reason.

There is a positive correlation for a higher level of AGR2 expression with poor therapeutic results in ERα-positive breast cancer patients. Agr2 mRNA expression is elevated in in vitro and in vivo studies responding to tamoxifen adjuvant therapy, so AGR2 is likely provides an agonistic effect on tamoxifen. Therefore, AGR2 is a possible predictive biomarker when selecting patients with ER-positive breast cancer to participate this therapy. Although Agr2 mRNA levels are correlated with the tamoxifen therapy response, AGR2 protein levels have yet to be statistically associated with the therapy. A combinatorial therapy using the anastrozole and fulvestrant has been shown to prevent binding of the ER to the Agr2 promoter, and there has been improved prognosis in the patients receiving it, possibly because AGR2 expression in the tumors have been reduced.

What AGR2 does in cancers is poorly understood. In breast cancer, HSP90 is a molecular chaperone expressed in tumor cells when there exists an excess of unfolded protein, and its co-chaperone has been reported to induce expression of AGR2, so AGR2 may be used by the endoplasmic reticulum to assist with protein folding to alleviate proteotoxic stress. AGR2 may help regulate the protein and mRNA levels in a cell overall as well. During late pregnancy and lactation, AGR2 levels peak when milk proteins are produced, and mammary-specific Agr2 knockout mice had downregulated milk protein mRNA expression.

=== Prostate cancer ===
AGR2 is expressed in relatively high levels for prostate cancer patients. Urine sediment tests determined Agr2 transcript levels to be elevated. AGR2 expression was increased in metastatic prostate cancer cells cultured in a bone marrow microenvironment, where intense levels of Agr2 mRNA were detected, suggesting AGR2 is required for bone metastasis of prostate cancer cells. AGR2 transcript levels were lower in metastatic lesions compared to the primary tumor, however. A greater chance of prostate cancer recurrence is linked to relatively lower levels of AGR2.

AGR2 depletion through gene knockdown was shown to result in accumulation of prostate cancer cell lines at the G0/G1 phase of the cell cycle, while forced expression of AGR led to an increase in cell proliferation. AGR2 was determined to be involved in cell adhesion. Agr2-silenced prostate cancer cells had a large decrease in association with fibronectin, lost expression of integrin, and reduced tumor cell migration. In addition to these studies, AGR2 was among a set of genes consistently associated with prostate tumour visibility on MRI in a bioinformatic analysis, the analysis found that more visible tumours harboured more aggressive genetic characteristics. The study also found genes involved with cell-ECM interactions to be altered in aggressive MRI-visible tumours, potentially reflecting AGR2's association with cellular adhesion ans integrin signalling.

=== Pancreatic cancer ===
AGR2 mRNA was discovered to be increased in precancerous lesions and neoplastic cells of pancreatic tumors and cancer cell lines. Transient silencing of AGR2 by small interfering RNA and short hairpin RNA significantly reduces cell proliferation and invasion while increasing the effectiveness of gemcitabine treatment in pancreatic cancer cell lines in vitro, indicating that AGR2 can help pancreatic cancer cells survive and protect tumors from chemotherapeutic treatments for pancreatic cancer. This is critical because pancreatic cancer is well recognized as being highly resistant to therapeutics, and five-year survival rates for pancreatic cancer are extremely low.

== Protein interactions ==
AGR2 protein has been demonstrated to interact with C4.4A and DAG-1 proteins which are associated with metastasis formation since these transmembrane proteins are involved in cell and matrix interactions between cancer and normal cells. AGR2 is able to suppress p53 activity by preventing phosphorylation after DNA damage. AGR2 has been shown to bind to Reptin, a tumor repressor, in the nucleus.
