= Sam Ruben =

- Born: November 5, 1913; San Francisco, CA, United States
- Died: September 28, 1943 (aged 29); Berkeley, CA, United States
- Education: University of California, Berkeley
- Awards: Abraham Rosenberg Research Fellow
- Scientific career
- Fields: Physical chemistry Biochemistry
- Thesis: Studies in Artificial Radioactivity
- Academic advisors: Ernest O. Lawrence

Samuel Ruben (born Charles Rubenstein; November 5, 1913 – September 28, 1943) was an American chemist who with Martin Kamen co-discovered the synthesis of the isotope carbon-14 in 1940.

== Early life and Education ==
Ruben was the son of Herschel and Frieda Penn Rubenstein – the name was officially shortened to Ruben in 1930. Young Sam developed a friendship with neighbor Jack Dempsey and became involved with a local boys' boxing club and later, when the family moved across the Bay to Berkeley, he was a successful basketball player at Berkeley High School (Berkeley, California). After achieving his B.S. in chemistry at the University of California, Berkeley, he continued his studies there and was awarded a Ph.D. in physical chemistry in May 1938. He was immediately appointed instructor in the chemistry department, and became an assistant professor in 1941.

== Research ==
Ruben and colleague Martin Kamen, a University of Chicago Ph.D. and researcher in chemistry and nuclear physics working under Ernest O. Lawrence at the Berkeley Radiation Laboratory, set out to elucidate the path of carbon in photosynthesis by incorporating the short-lived radioactive isotope carbon-11 (^{11}CO_{2}) in their many experiments between 1938 and 1942. Aided by the concepts and collaboration of C. B. van Niel, at Stanford University's Hopkins Marine Station, it became clear to them that reduction of CO_{2} can occur in the dark and may involve processes similar to bacterial systems. This interpretation challenged the century-old Adolf von Baeyer theory of photochemical reduction of CO_{2} adsorbed on chlorophyll which had guided decades of effort by Richard Willstätter, Arthur Stoll, and many others in vain searches for formaldehyde.

In hundreds of experiments with carbon-11 produced from deuterons and boron-10 by Kamen in the Radiation Laboratory's 37-inch cyclotron, Ruben and Kamen, with collaborators from botany, microbiology, physiology and organic chemistry, pursued the path of carbon dioxide in plants, algae, and bacteria. Their results, confused by absorption of the products on proteinaceous residues, initially failed to reveal the path of carbon in photosynthesis but succeeded in exciting the interest of scientists worldwide in the search and revelation of metabolic processes, beginning a revolution in biochemistry and medicine.

Ruben's experiments using 'heavy water', H_{2}^{18}O, to yield ^{18}O_{2} gas had shown that the oxygen gas produced in photosynthesis comes from water. With nuclear physicists' tenuous prediction of a "long-lived radioactive carbon isotope", Ruben and Kamen pursued several routes that could lead to identification of the carbon-14 isotope. After several failed attempts, Kamen collected the results of a 120-hour cyclotron bombardment of graphite and trudged in the rain with it to the "Rat House", adjacent both to the chemistry department and to the cyclotron, and Ruben's desk. At 8 am, February 27, 1940, Ruben demonstrated unequivocally that the radioactivity was from carbon-14.

Use of carbon-14 in tracer experiments was hindered by the difficulty measuring the weak beta emission of the radioactive decay and by the onset of World War II that shut off production of the isotope. In 1942 Ruben was assigned to work on war related research away from Berkeley. Further, Kamen was removed from his position at Berkeley due to allegations he was a security risk. Ruben fully realized the potential use of this isotope and was committed to working to elucidate the mechanism of photosynthetic carbon fixation using carbon-14. Instead, Ruben gave all his barium carbonate-^{14}C to chemistry department faculty member Andrew Benson who began his long series of ^{14}CO_{2} fixation experiments to determine the path of carbon in photosynthesis. Only in 1949 did chemist Willard Libby use it to invent radiocarbon dating.

Ruben's recruitment for research in the World War II wartime effort led him to interest in the mechanism of phosgene as a poisonous gas. With C-11 phosgene (^{11}COCl_{2}) prepared by Benson, they studied the combination of phosgene with lung proteins. Benson departed from Berkeley in July 1943.

Sam Ruben married Helena Collins West, a fellow chemistry student, during his final semester as an undergraduate at UC Berkeley, on September 28, 1935. They had three children: Dana West Ruben (born November 11, 1938), George Collins Ruben (born April 29, 1941), who became a professor at Dartmouth College, and Constance Mae Ruben Fatt (born June 18, 1943).

== Death ==
After a disastrous exposure to phosgene in a laboratory accident on September 27, 1943, Sam Ruben was transferred to the Cowell Memorial Hospital on the UC Berkeley campus. He died the following day which was his eighth wedding anniversary to his wife Helena.

== Sources ==
- Ruben, S.; Kamen, M. D. (1941). "Long-Lived Radioactive Carbon: C^{14}". Physical Review. 59 (4): 349–354. Bibcode:1941PhRv...59..349R. doi:10.1103/PhysRev.59.349.
- Kamen, Martin D. (1985). Radiant Science, Dark Politics: A Memoir of the Nuclear Age. Berkeley, California: University of California Press. ISBN 0-520-04929-2.
- Johnston, Harold (2003). A Bridge Not Attacked: Chemical Warfare Civilian Research During World War II. River Edge, NJ: World Scientific Publishing Company. ISBN 981-238-152-X.
