= Martin Kamen =

American chemist (1913–2002)

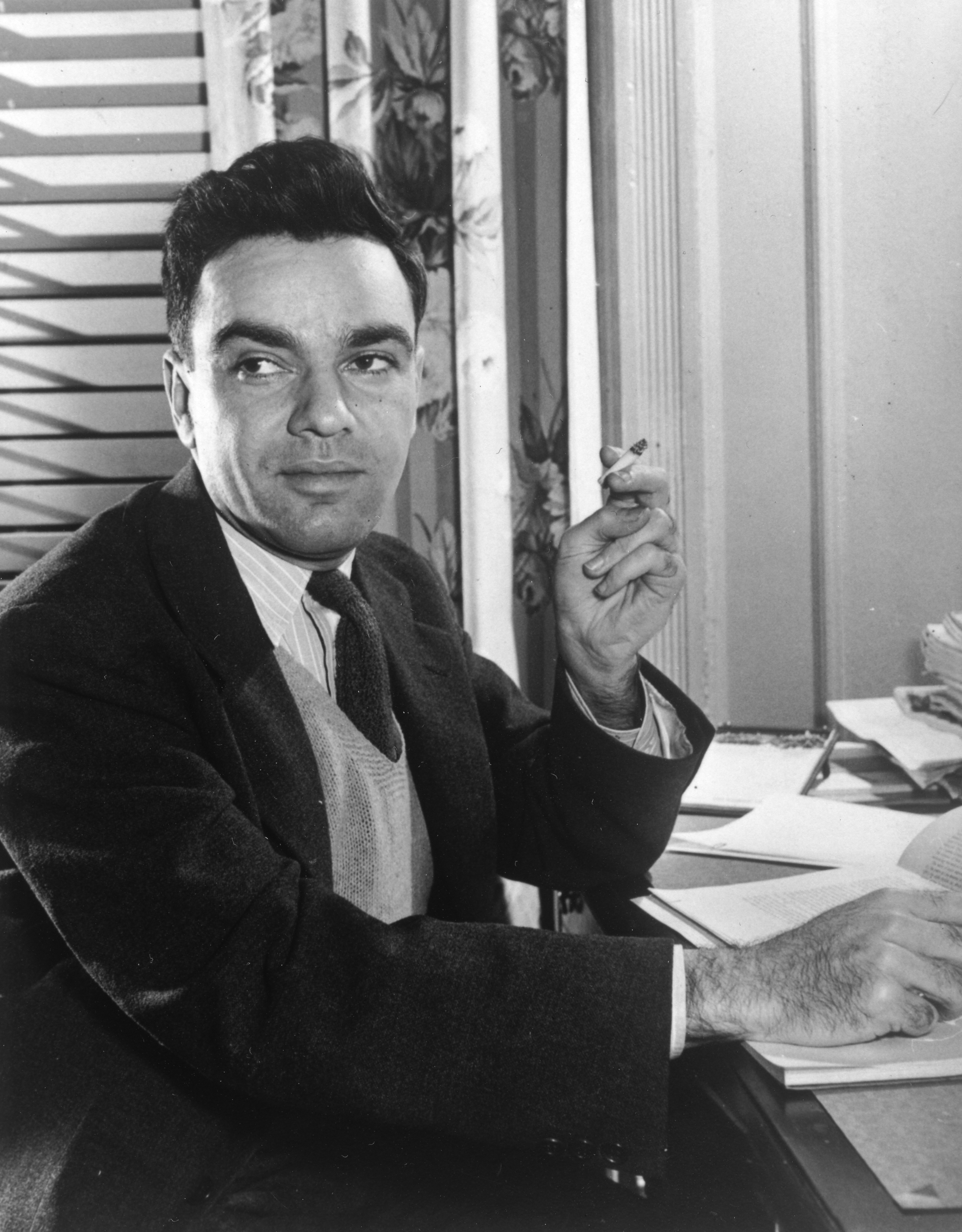
- Born: Martin David Kamen; August 27, 1913; Toronto, Canada
- Died: August 31, 2002 (aged 89); Montecito, California, US
- Education: University of Chicago
- Known for: Synthesis of the isotope carbon-14
- Scientific career
- Fields: Chemistry
- Workplaces: University of California Radiation Laboratory
- Thesis: Neutron-Proton Inter-action: The Scattering of Neutrons by Protons
- Doctoral advisor: William D. Harkins

Martin David Kamen (August 27, 1913 – August 31, 2002) was an American chemist who, together with Sam Ruben, co-discovered the synthesis of the isotope carbon-14 on February 27, 1940, at the University of California Radiation Laboratory, Berkeley. He also confirmed that all of the oxygen released in photosynthesis comes from water, not carbon dioxide, in 1941.

Kamen was the first to use carbon-14 to study a biochemical system, and his work revolutionized biochemistry and molecular biology, enabling scientists to trace a wide variety of biological reactions and processes. Despite being blacklisted for nearly a decade on suspicion of being a security risk, Kamen went on to receive the Albert Einstein World Award of Science in 1989, and the U.S. Department of Energy's 1995 Enrico Fermi award for lifetime scientific achievement.

== Early life and education ==
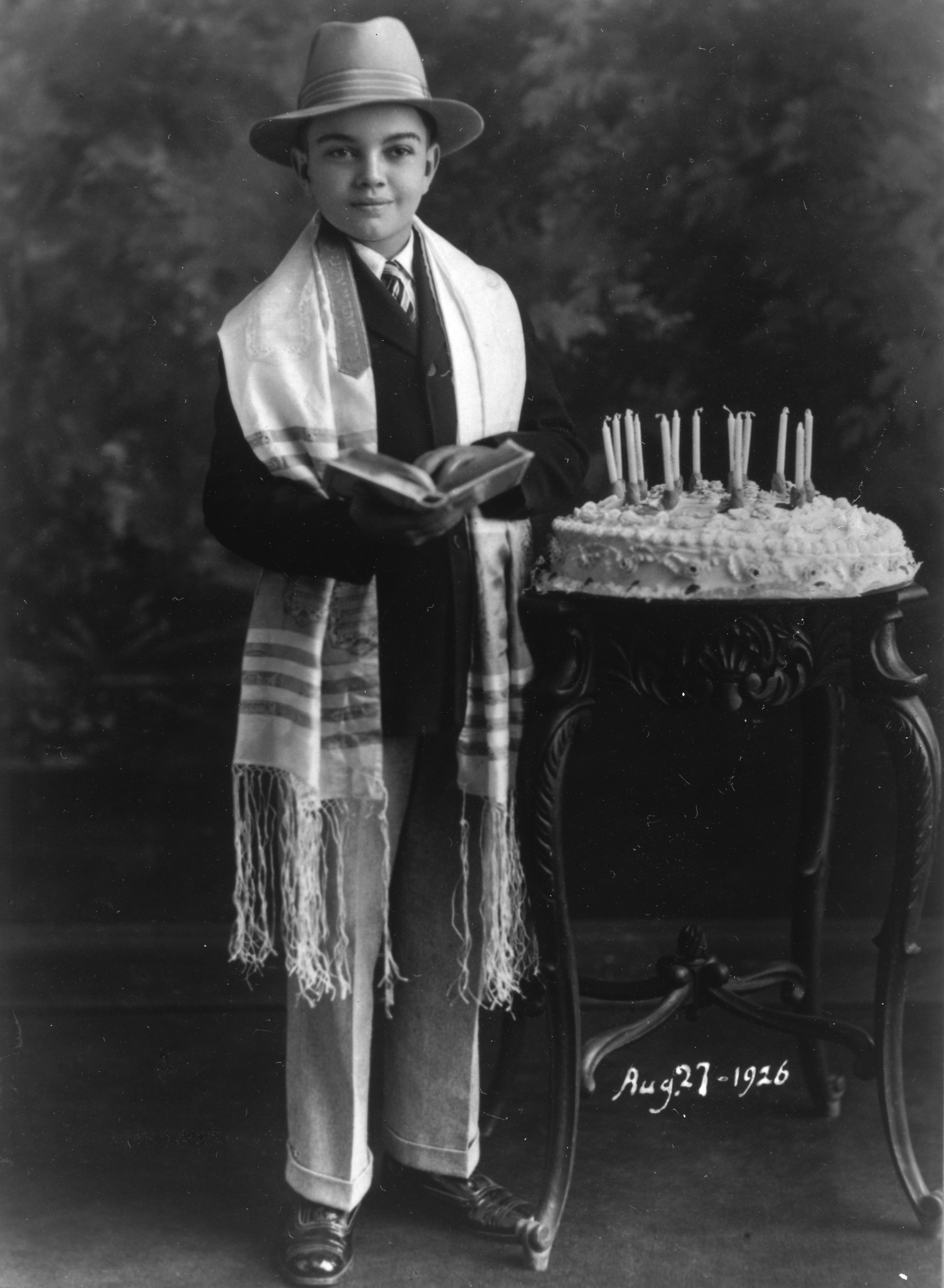
Martin Kamen at his Bar Mitzva, 1926

Kamen was born on August 27, 1913, in Toronto, the son of Russian-Jewish immigrants. He grew up in Chicago. Interested in classical music, he initially entered the University of Chicago as a music student before changing his major from music to chemistry. Although he gave up music as a career, Kamen continued to play the viola at a high professional level during the rest of his life.

Kamen received a bachelor's degree in chemistry from the University of Chicago in 1933. In 1936, Kamen earned a PhD in physical chemistry from the same university after working with William D. Harkins on "Neutron-Proton Inter-action: The Scattering of Neutrons by Protons."

== Career ==
From 1936 to 1944, Kamen worked at the Radiation laboratories at the University of California, Berkeley. Kamen gained a research position in chemistry and nuclear physics under Ernest Lawrence by working without pay for six months, until he was hired to oversee the preparation and distribution of the cyclotron's products. Kamen's major achievements during his time at Berkeley included the co-discovery of the synthesis of carbon-14 with Sam Ruben on February 27, 1940, and the confirmation that all of the oxygen released in photosynthesis comes from water, not carbon dioxide, in 1941. On the same day as the discovery of the synthesis of carbon-14, Kamen had mistakenly been arrested on suspicion of several murders prior to the discovery, as the authorities were looking for an escaped convict. He was released when witnesses confirmed he was not the suspect.

From 1941 to 1944, Kamen and others at the Berkeley Radiation Laboratory worked on the Manhattan Project. In 1943, Kamen was assigned to Manhattan Project work at Oak Ridge, Tennessee, where he worked briefly before returning to Berkeley. In spite of the fact that his scientific capabilities were unquestioned, Kamen was fired from Berkeley in July 1944 on suspicion of being a security risk. He was suspected of leaking nuclear weapons secrets to the Soviet Union (which at the time was allied with the US and others against Nazi Germany).

Kamen was unable to obtain another academic position until 1945 when he was hired by Arthur Holly Compton to run the cyclotron program in the medical school of Washington University in St. Louis. Kamen taught the faculty how to use radioactive tracer materials in research, and continued to develop his interests in biochemistry. His book Isotopic Tracers in Biology (1947) became a standard text on tracer methodology and highly influenced tracer use in biochemistry.

In 1957, Kamen moved to Brandeis University in Massachusetts where he helped Nathan Oram Kaplan to establish the Graduate Department of Biochemistry. In 1961 Kamen joined the University of California, San Diego, where he founded a biochemistry group as part of the university's new department of chemistry. Kamen remained at the University of California, San Diego, retiring from teaching (but not research) to become an emeritus professor in 1978.

Martin Kamen died August 31, 2002, at the age of 89 in Montecito (Santa Barbara), California.

== Research ==
Although carbon-14 was previously known, the discovery of the synthesis of carbon-14 occurred at Berkeley in 1940 when Kamen and Sam Ruben bombarded graphite in the cyclotron in hopes of producing a radioactive isotope of carbon that could be used as a tracer in investigating chemical reactions in photosynthesis. Their experiment resulted in production of carbon-14. By bombarding matter with particles in the cyclotron, radioactive isotopes such as carbon-14 were generated. Using carbon-14, the order of events in biochemical reactions could be elucidated, showing the precursors of a particular biochemical product, revealing the network of reactions that constitute life.

Kamen confirmed in 1941 that all of the oxygen released in photosynthesis comes from water, not carbon dioxide. He also studied anoxygenic photosynthetic bacteria, the biochemistry of cytochromes and their role in photosynthesis and metabolism, photosynthetic bacteria, the role of molybdenum in biological nitrogen fixation, the role of iron in the activity of porphyrin compounds in plants and animals, and calcium exchange in cancerous tumors, making substantial contributions.

== Security risk controversy ==
Kamen came under long-term suspicion of espionage activity as a result of two incidents in 1944. He has described his experiences during this era in his autobiography, Radiant Science, Dark Politics. He first aroused suspicion while working at Oak Ridge. A cyclotron operator prepared radioactive sodium for an experiment, and Kamen was surprised that the resulting sodium had a purple glow, indicating it was much more intensely radioactive than could be produced in a cyclotron. Kamen recognized immediately that the sodium must have been irradiated in a nuclear reactor elsewhere in the facility. Because of wartime secrecy, he had not been aware of the reactor's existence. He excitedly told Ernest O. Lawrence about his discovery, in the hearing of Lawrence's Army escort. Shortly thereafter, an investigation was launched to find out who had leaked the information to Kamen.

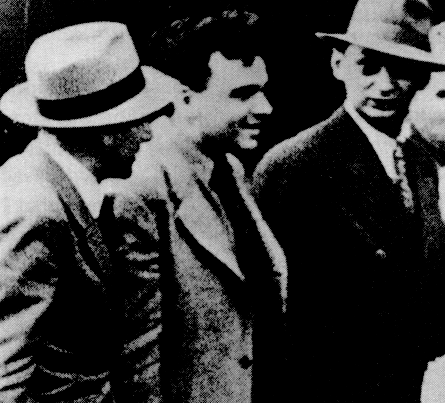
A surveillance photograph of Kheifets, Kamen and Kasparov

After returning to Berkeley, Kamen met two Russian officials at a party given by his friend, the violinist Isaac Stern, whom he sometimes accompanied as a viola player in social evenings of chamber music. The Russians were Grigory Kheifets and Grigory Kasparov, posted as undercover KGB officers in the Soviet Union's San Francisco consulate. One of them asked Kamen for assistance in getting in touch with Rad Lab scientist John H. Lawrence about an experimental radiation treatment for a colleague with leukemia (Commander Kalinin of the Russian Navy, under treatment at the United States Navy Hospital in Seattle, Washington). Kamen put them in contact, and in appreciation he was invited for dinner at a local restaurant. FBI agents observed the dinner, on July 1, 1944, took a photograph of the men together, and submitted a report alleging Kamen to have discussed atomic research with Kheifets. In a memorandum of July 11, 1944, Army officials ordered Lawrence to have Martin Kamen dismissed from his Berkeley position and his work on the Manhattan Project on suspicion of being a “security risk.” There was no hearing or method of appeal.

In addition, Ruth B. Shipley at the Passport Division of the State Department revoked Kamen's passport in 1947, and repeatedly refused to reissue it. This had significant negative effects on Kamen's career and research, preventing him from traveling abroad to give lectures, attend conferences, and take up visiting professorships. In 1948, the House Committee on Un-American Activities summoned Kamen to testify about his dinner conversation of 1944. From 1947-1955 Kamen engaged in repeated attempts to regain his passport and to engage in international scientific activities. He sought legal counsel in 1950, and started litigation to regain his passport and right to travel, gaining support from the Federation of American Scientists, the American Civil Liberties Union and others.

In 1951 the Chicago Tribune published an article that named him as a suspected spy for the Soviets, further damaging his reputation. Soon after, Kamen attempted suicide. He went on to sue the Chicago Tribune and the Washington Times-Herald for libel, winning his suit in 1955. It took Kamen nearly 10 years to establish his innocence and prove that he had been unjustly blacklisted as a security risk. He was finally able to regain his passport as of July 9, 1955.

== Awards and honors ==
Kamen was elected a Fellow of the American Physical Society in 1941. He became a fellow of the American Academy of Arts and Sciences in 1958. In 1962, Kamen was elected as a member of the National Academy of Sciences. He was elected to the American Philosophical Society in 1974.

Kamen became a Guggenheim Fellowship recipient in 1956 and again in 1972, in the field of Molecular and Cellular Biology. Kamen was awarded the Charles F. Kettering Award for Excellence in Photosynthesis Research from the American Society of Plant Biologists in 1968 and the Merck Award of the American Society of Biological Chemists in 1982. He received the 1989 Albert Einstein World Award of Science. On April 24, 1996, he was presented with the 1995 Enrico Fermi Award, given by the U.S. President and the Department of Energy for lifetime scientific achievement. Some believe he should have won a Nobel Prize, for which he was nominated 14 times between 1955 and 1970.

== Books ==
- Kamen, Martin D. (1947). Radioactive Tracers in Biology: An Introduction to Tracer Methodology (1st ed.). New York: Academic Press.
- Kamen, Martin David (1963). Primary processes in photosynthesis. New York: Academic Press. ISBN 9781483274454.
- Kamen, Martin D. (1964). A Tracer Experiment: Tracing Biochemical Reactions with Radioisotopes. New York: Holt Rinehart Winston.
- Kamen, Martin David (1985). Radiant science, dark politics : a memoir of the nuclear age. Berkeley: University of California Press. ISBN 978-0520049291. Foreword by Edwin M. McMillan.

== Archives ==
- Martin David Kamen Papers MSS 98. UC San Diego Library Special Collections & Archives, UC San Diego Library.
- Kamen, Martin, Vertical File, Bernard Becker Medical Library, Washington University in St. Louis.
- Martin David Kamen papers : ca. 1937-1945, Bancroft Library, UC Berkeley
