= Mucosectomy =

Surgical removal of a mucous membrane

Mucotomy is a surgical procedure of excising the mucous membrane from an organ. This is done as part of several gastrointestinal surgeries, such as antireflux mucosectomy for the treatment of Barrett's esophagus, colectomy for treating various intestinal disorders, and per-oral endoscopic myotomy for treatment of achalasia.
