= Endoscopic mucosal resection =

- Specialty: Gastroenterology

Endoscopic mucosal resection is a technique used to remove cancerous or other abnormal lesions found in the digestive tract. It is one method of performing a mucosectomy with submucosal saline injection first published 1973 by Deyhle ( Deyhle, P. et al.: A Method for Endoscopic Electroresection of Sessile Colonic Polyps. Endoscopy 5. 38 - 40, 1973 )

== For the esophagous ==
Endoscopic mucosal resection has been advocated for early esophageal cancers (that is, those that are superficial and confined to the mucosa only) and has been shown to be a less invasive, safe, and effective therapy for early squamous cell carcinoma. It has also been shown to be safe and effective for early adenocarcinoma arising in Barrett’s esophagus. The prognosis after treatment with this method is comparable to surgical resection. This technique can be attempted in patients who have no evidence of nodal or distant metastases, with differentiated tumors that are slightly raised and less than 2 cm in diameter, or in differentiated tumors that are ulcerated and less than 1 cm in diameter. The most commonly employed modalities of endoscopic mucosal resection include strip biopsy, double-snare polypectomy, resection with combined use of highly concentrated saline and epinephrine, and resection using a cap.

The strip biopsy method for endoscopic mucosal resection of esophageal cancer is performed with a double-channel endoscope equipped with grasping forceps and snare. After marking the lesion border with an electric coagulator, saline is injected into the submucosa below the lesion to separate the lesion from the muscle layer and to force its protrusion. The grasping forceps are passed through the snare loop. The mucosa surrounding the lesion is grasped, lifted, and strangulated and resected by electrocautery. The endoscopic double-snare polypectomy method is indicated for protruding lesions. Using a double-channel scope, the lesion is grasped and lifted by the first snare and strangulated with the second snare for complete resection.

Endoscopic resection with injection of concentrated saline and epinephrine is carried out using a double-channel scope. The lesion borders are marked with a coagulator. Highly concentrated saline and epinephrine are injected (15–20 ml) into the submucosal layer to swell the area containing the lesion and elucidate the markings. The mucosa outside the demarcated border is excised using a high-frequency scalpel to the depth of the submucosal layer. The resected mucosa is lifted and grasped with forceps, trapping and strangulating the lesion with a snare, and then resected by electrocautery.

Another method of endoscopic mucosal resection employs the use of a clear cap and looped snare inside the cap. After insertion, the cap is placed on the lesion and the mucosa containing the lesion is drawn up inside the cap by aspiration. The mucosa is caught by the snare and strangulated, and finally resected by electrocautery. This is called the "band and snare" or "suck and cut" technique. The resected specimen is retrieved and submitted for microscopic examination for determination of tumor invasion depth, resection margin, and possible vascular involvement. The resulting "ulcer" heals within three weeks.

Endoscopic mucosal resection can also be used to either debulk or completely treat polypoid dysplastic or malignant lesions in Barrett’s esophagus, the known precursor lesion to esophageal adenocarcinoma. In a preliminary report from Germany, it was performed as primary treatment or adjunctive therapy following photodynamic therapy for early adenocarcinomas in Barrett's esophagus. The "suck and cut" technique (both with and without prior saline injection) was used, as well as the "band and cut" technique. Although all tumors were resected without difficulty, 12.5% developed bleeding (which was managed successfully by endoscopic therapy). Eighty-one percent of the lesions were completely resected. The other lesions were also treated with other endoscopic techniques.

The major complications of endoscopic mucosal resection include postoperative bleeding, perforation, and stricture formation. During the procedure, an injection of 1:100,000 diluted epinephrine into the muscular wall, along with high-frequency coagulation or clipping, can be applied to the bleeding point for hemostasis. It is important to administer acid-reducing medications to prevent postoperative hemorrhage. Perforation may be prevented with sufficient saline injection to raise the mucosa containing the lesion. The "nonlifting sign" and complaints of pain when the snare strangulates the lesion are contraindications to doing the procedure. When perforation is recognized immediately afterwards, the perforation should be closed by clips. Surgery should be considered in cases of endoscopic closure failure. The incidence of complications ranges from 0–50% and recurrence of esophageal squamous cell carcinoma range from 0–8%.

== For the colon and rectum ==
Endoscopic mucosal resection and submucosal dissection are also highly effective methods for resection or large, non-malignant colorectal polyps and superficially (stage T1a) invasive colorectal cancers. The largest study of endoscopic mucosal resection by the Australian Consortium included 1000 cases and long term surveillance. After exclusion of 79 unresectable lesions, the remainder were treated by endoscopic mucosal resection. Overall 98.1% were disease free at the end of two rounds (typically at 6 and 18 months) of follow up. Endoscopic mucosal resection has been shown to be less expensive and safer compared to surgical resection of large, non-invasive polyps of the bowel. Endoscopic mucosal resection requires training to achieve proficiency. The Mayo Clinic Florida group reported that at least 100 procedures are needed to achieve proficiency. Many centers in the United States now offer high-quality, high-volume colorectal endoscopic mucosal resection.
