= Andrew Benson =

American biologist and professor

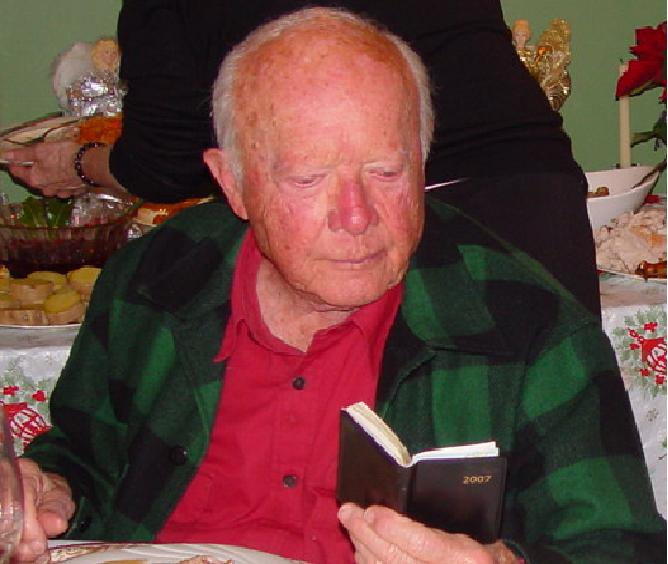
- Benson in 2007
- Born: Andrew Alm Benson; September 24, 1917; Modesto, California
- Died: January 16, 2015 (aged 97); La Jolla, California
- Awards: Ernest Orlando Lawrence Award (1962)
- Scientific career
- Fields: Biochemistry
- Workplaces: Scripps Institution of Oceanography

Andrew Alm Benson (September 24, 1917 – January 16, 2015) was an American biologist and a professor of biology at the University of California, San Diego, until his retirement in 1989. He is known for his work in understanding the carbon cycle in plants.

== Early life and education ==
Benson was born on September 24, 1917, in Modesto, California, the son of a rural physician of Swedish immigrant stock. He studied as an undergraduate and masters student at the University of California, Berkeley, where he learned optics from Luis Alvarez and worked in the chemistry lab of Glenn T. Seaborg. In 1942, he received his Ph.D. from the California Institute of Technology; at Caltech, he worked under the supervision of Carl Niemann, conducting experiments on the fluorination of thyroxine; his later thesis work concerned "periodate and lead tetraacetate degradation of its vicinal amino glycol". At that time he also became a conscientious objector to the war in Europe, a political position that caused difficulties for him when he moved back to Berkeley following his graduation.

== Post-graduate career ==
Benson returned to Berkeley as an instructor in July 1942. In May 1946 he was invited to join the group of Melvin Calvin, who was then starting a photosynthesis group in Berkeley's Old Radiation Laboratory, a building that had previously housed a 37-inch cyclotron built in 1937 by Ernest Lawrence. He visited Norway from 1951 to 1952 on a Fulbright fellowship to the Norwegian College of Agriculture, and took a faculty position at Pennsylvania State University in 1954. He moved to UCSD from a previous position at the University of California, Los Angeles, in 1962. In the same year, He joined the Scripps Institution of Oceanography. From 1965 to 1969, he chaired its Marine Biology Research Division. From 1970 to 1976, he directed its Physiological Research Laboratory.

== Research ==
In work done from 1946 through 1953, along with Melvin Calvin and James Bassham, Benson elucidated the path of carbon assimilation (the photosynthetic carbon reduction cycle) in plants. The carbon reduction cycle is known as the Calvin cycle, which inappropriately ignores the contribution of Bassham and Benson. Many scientists refer to the cycle as the Calvin–Benson Cycle, Benson–Calvin, and some call it the Calvin–Benson–Bassham (or CBB) Cycle.

In a paper in the 2002 Annual Review of Plant Biology, Benson provided an in-depth retrospective on his life and work.

== Awards and honors ==
Benson was elected to the National Academy of Sciences in 1972, the American Academy of Arts and Sciences in 1981, and the Norwegian Academy of Science and Letters in 1984. In 1962, the United States Department of Energy gave him the Ernest Orlando Lawrence Award for his work using radioactive isotopes to understand the carbon cycle. He also received the Sugar Research Foundation Award in 1950 and the Stephen Hales Prize of the American Society of Plant Biologists in 1972 for his discovery of ribulose as a product of the carbon cycle. In 2007, a special issue of Photosynthesis Research was dedicated to him in honor of his 90th birthday.

Benson is a major figure (at Calvin's expense) in episode 2, dealing with photosynthesis, of the history of botany presented in 2011 on BBC Four. The series is presented by Timothy Walker and is entitled Botany—A Blooming History.
