= Norman Barrett =

Australian-born British thoracic surgeon (1903–1979)

Norman Rupert Barrett CBE FRSA (16 May 1903 – 8 January 1979) was an Australian-born English thoracic surgeon who is widely yet mistakenly remembered for describing what became known as Barrett's oesophagus.

== Early life and education ==
Norman Rupert Barrett was born on 16 May 1903 in Adelaide, South Australia, to Alfred and Catherine Barrett. His great uncle, James Barrett, was a doctor, and four of James's children became doctors. One of these children, Norman's uncle Sir James Barrett, was a founder of the Royal Australasian College of Surgeons and a Chancellor of Melbourne University.

Norman moved to England at the age of 10, and was educated at The New Beacon, Eton College and Trinity College, Cambridge. He was given his lifelong nickname, Pasty, while at Eton.

== Career ==
Barrett trained at St. Thomas' Hospital, and graduated in 1928. He continued as resident assistant surgeon at St. Thomas' Hospital, and was elected as Fellow of the Royal College of Surgeons in 1930. He was awarded the postgraduate degree M Chir in 1931. In 1935, he became a consultant surgeon at St. Thomas', where he remained for the rest of his career.

He travelled to the United States on a Rockefeller Travelling Fellowship from 1935 to 1936, working at the Mayo Clinic, and visiting Boston, St. Louis and Michigan. It was during this time that he decided to focus on thoracic surgery, rather than gastrointestinal surgery as he had initially intended.

In 1946, he wrote a paper for the first issue of Thorax on spontaneous rupture of the oesophagus (Boerhaave syndrome), in which he commented that "in the byways of surgery there can be few conditions more dramatic in their presentation and more terrible in their symptoms than spontaneous perforation of the oesophagus. No case has yet been treated successfully, and diagnosis has only been achieved in a very few before death." A year later, on 7 March 1947, he performed the first successful repair of a ruptured oesophagus.

In 1950, he published a paper in which he described the oesophagus as "that part of the foregut, distal to the cricopharyngeal sphincter, which is lined by squamous epithelium." In this paper, Barrett suggested that the finding of an oesophagus lined with columnar epithelium (rather than the usual squamous epithelium) was due to the presence of a congenitally shortened oesophagus leading to a tubular portion of stomach being trapped in the chest. In this article Barrett credited Philip Rowland Allison for coining the term reflux oesophagitis in 1948, noting that was the 'best name for the lesion' Allison had so ably described.

In contrast, Philip Rowland Allison and Alan Johnstone argued that this columnar epithelium–lined structure was oesophagus and not stomach, and suggested that ulcers in this structure be called "Barrett's ulcers". Seven years after his initial article Barrett accepted this view, suggesting that it be called the "lower oesophagus lined by columnar epithelium". The columnar epithelium ascending the esophagus from the stomach has subsequently become known as Barrett's oesophagus.

In addition to his work on oesophageal disease, Barrett also worked with Leonard Dudgeon, Professor of Pathology at the University of London, on the cytology of sputum in the diagnosis of pulmonary malignancy. He is also noted for his treatment of hydatid cysts.

Barrett was a lecturer in surgery for the University of London (1935–1970), Surgeon to King Edward VII Sanatorium in Midhurst, West Sussex (1938–1970), and Consulting Thoracic Surgeon to both the Royal Navy and the Ministry of Social Security (1944–1970).

== Other activities ==
Outside his medical interests, Barrett was also interested in the history of medicine, drawing and painting, and was a keen sailor.

He edited Thorax, the journal of thoracic surgery, from its inception in 1946 until 1971.

== Honours ==
Barrett was appointed a CBE in 1969, and retired in 1970. He died in London on 8 January 1979.

== Personal life and death ==
Barrett married Annabel Elizabeth "Betty" Warington Smyth on 21 April 1931. She was the sister of a school friend, and they had met six years previously. Betty had studied English and Art, and later became a novelist. They had two children, Julia and Althea. After Norman had been appointed a consultant at St. Thomas' Hospital, the Barrett family lived at 2 Dorset Street, Marylebone, London for about 20 years. In 1954 they moved to Richmond Green.

Barrett died on 8 January 1979.
