= James Bassham =

American chemist (1922–2012)

James A. Bassham
- Born: November 26, 1922; Sacramento, California, United States
- Died: November 19, 2012 (aged 89); El Cerrito, California, USA
- Education: University of California, Berkeley
- Known for: Work on photosynthesis
- Scientific career
- Fields: Biology
- Workplaces: Lawrence Radiation Laboratory

James Alan Bassham (November 26, 1922 – November 19, 2012) was an American scientist known for his work on photosynthesis.

== Education and early research ==
He received a B.S. degree in chemistry in 1945 from the University of California, Berkeley, earning his Ph.D. degree from Berkeley in 1949. His graduate studies were on the subject of carbon reduction during photosynthesis, working with Melvin Calvin in the Bio-Organic Chemistry Group of the Lawrence Radiation Laboratory at the University of California. He discovered, with Melvin Calvin and Andrew Benson, the Calvin-Benson-Bassham cycle. He continued his work as Associate Director of this group.

== Scientific career ==
Besides his work on the basic carbon reduction cycle of photosynthesis, Bassham conducted research on the biosynthetic paths leading from the cycle to the thermodynamics and kinetics of the carbon paths and the factors that control the flow of material and energy in this metabolic network. He is coauthor (with Melvin Calvin) of "The Path of Carbon in Photosynthesis".

== Death ==
He died on November 19, 2012.
