= Polypectomy =

Surgical removal of a polyp

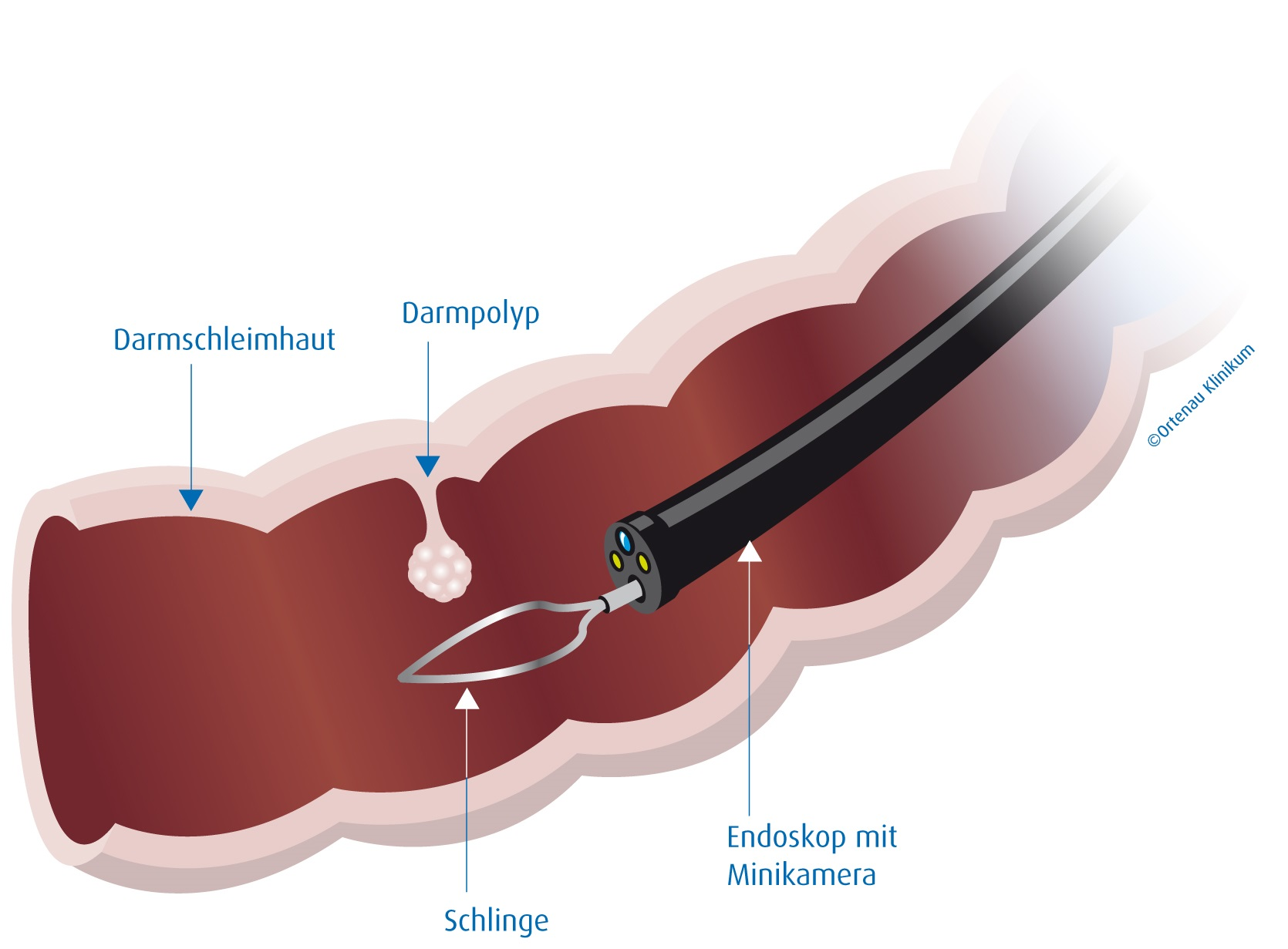
Method of removing a polyp with a sling

In medicine, a polypectomy is the surgical removal of an abnormal growth of tissue called a polyp. Polypectomy can be performed by excision if the polyp is external (on the skin).

== See also ==
- Colonic polypectomy
- Non-lifting sign
