= Timothy Walker (botanist) =

UK botanist

- Born: 10 July 1958 (age 67); South Buckinghamshire, England
- Education: Abingdon School; University College, Oxford
- Occupation: Botanist

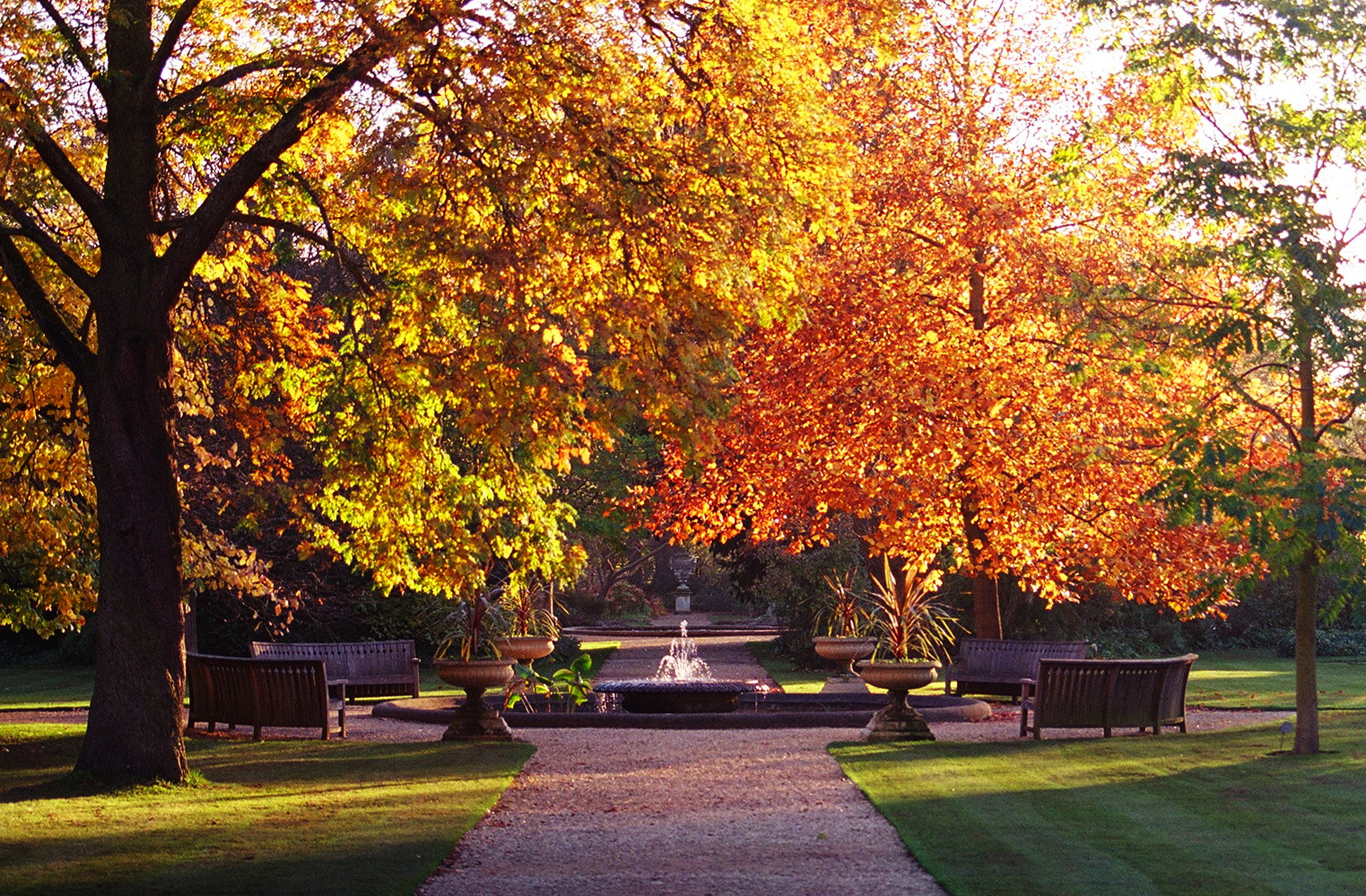
Timothy Walker was the Horti Praefectus of the Oxford Botanic Garden

Timothy Walker (born 10 July 1958) is a British botanist. He was the Horti Praefectus (Director) of the University of Oxford Botanic Garden and Harcourt Arboretum.

== Biography ==
After attending Abingdon School from 1971 to 1976, Walker studied for a BA degree in Botany at University College, Oxford, from 1977 to 1980. From 1980 to 1982, he was a trainee gardener at the Oxford Botanic Garden. He studied for a National Certificate in Horticulture at Askham Bryan College in North Yorkshire during 1982–83. Then during 1983–84 he was a trainee gardener at the Savill Garden in Windsor Great Park. He was a diploma student at Kew Gardens during 1984–85.

From 1986 to 1988 he was General Foreman at the Oxford Botanic Garden then from 1988 to 2014 he was Horti Praefectus of the Garden. He also holds a lectureship in Plant Conservation at Somerville College, Oxford, and is a lecturer in biology at the Department of Biology, University of Oxford. He has won four gold medals at the Chelsea Flower Show in London.

In June 2011, Walker presented Botany: A Blooming History, a series of three television programmes broadcast on BBC Four, covering the history of botany. The series was repeated, again on BBC4, in August 2022.

== Publications ==
=== Books ===
- Plants: A Very Short Introduction. Oxford University Press. 26 April 2012. pp. 1–152. ISBN 9780191634000.
- Plant Conservation: Why It Matters and How It Works. Timber Press. 3 December 2013. pp. 1–304. ISBN 9781604695694.
- Pollination: The Enduring Relationship Between Plant and Pollinator. Princeton University Press. 6 October 2020. pp. 1–224. ISBN 9780691203751.

== See also ==
- List of Old Abingdonians
