= Congenital hypertrophy of the retinal pigment epithelium =

Pigmented fundus lesion

Congenital hypertrophy of the retinal pigment epithelium (CHRPE) is a harmless, pigmented fundus lesion that can be of various forms: solitary, grouped, and atypical, and are found through clinical eye screenings from digital retinal imaging often established by ophthalmologists. It is an uncommon diagnostic that is primarily found in patients before reaching their 30s, with the lesions often enlarging with time, thus being difficult to detect in younger ages. With the detection of CHRPE, patients with CHRPE appearing with multiple shaped lesions are often the ones known to have Familial adenomatous polyposis (FAP). Procedures are done to help establish further understanding of what is to be done when traces of CHRPE are found through eye exams, with education being a top priority for patients who have the CHRPE lesions to help them determine what the next steps are. With this discovery, patients are highly encouraged to receive a colonoscopy in order to detect colorectal polyps, these often having high risks of being cancerous.

== Signs and symptoms ==
CHRPE is often discovered in annual eye exams, discovered by the digital imaging. It is uncommon to identify this by staring into a mirror as the lesions that are grouped together is to small to see with the human eye. There are three separate versions of CHRPE: solitary, grouped and atypical.

- Solitary CHRPE: flat pigmented circular distinguished lesions that appear on the outer fundus, which is often considered the peripheral.
- Grouped CHRPE: established as "bear tracks" as they resemble the animal like footprint. Appearing in clustered groups with darker grey pigments, enlarging the closer they are to the periphery.
- Atypical CHRPE: bilateral, fishtail or comma shaped lesions appearing in areas around the fundus.

=== Links with colorectal cancer ===
FAP is a connector to atypical CHRPE. FAP spawns from a mutation located on chromosome 5q21.1, this mutation is the adenomatous polyposis coli (APC)— a tumor suppressor gene. It is a condition in which hundreds of polyps are found within the colon through a colonoscopy that, if left untreated, can lead to colorectal cancer.

== Cause ==
CHRPE is often developed through birth, with patients only showing signs of it in late adulthood, as CHRPE is often difficult to identify in younger ages due to the lesions being smaller, while growing with time. CHRPE gene can establish from intra-familial variation, indicating that those individuals who are a part of CHRPE positive families should be tested from the colonoscopy biopsy and or genetic analysis to establish whether the gene is positive or negative.

== Risk factor ==
Risk factors include:

- Because the RPE layer grows thicker as CHRPE cells grow, the RPE can malfunction. This can disrupt the support of photoreceptors, which can result in cell loss, leading to possibly vision loss. However, apart from CHRPE, this is a rare phenomenon.
- Possibility of developing colorectal cancer: grouped and atypical CHRPE in either eyes can be connected with FAP. Those with these two CHRPE forms are prone to colon cancers.

== Diagnosis ==
=== Classification ===
CHRPE is a lesion with the retinal pigment epithelial (RPE)— densely packed cells in a single layer forming a blockage between the retina and the choroid— that is generally cordial. There are three variations of CHRPE: solitary, grouped, and atypical, with these being found in ophthalmoscopes. These exhibit an increase in cell size, normally elongated and rod-like shape, causing the RPE layer to become more dense in dimension.
