= ELVIS Procedure =

The ELVIS Procedure is a hybrid endoscopic and laparoscopic operation for evaluation of the colon. ELVIS stands for endoscopic/laparoscopic visualisation. This procedure is utilized for patients in whom a standard colonoscopy was unable to be completed. This is also found in the surgical literature as a "laparoscopic-assisted endoscopy" and has been described since 1992.

This typically is associated with anatomic issues such as a redundant sigmoid colon or a transverse colon which prevents complete advancement of the colonoscope to the cecum. During an ELVIS procedure one proceduralist attempts a standard colonoscopy in the operating room with the patient under anesthesia. At the same time, a surgeon introduces laparoscopic ports into the patient's abdomen. Typically one or two ports are necessary. Through one port a laparoscope is introduced (usually through a 12 mm port in the umbilicus) and another port is used for introduction of a laparoscopic instrument, such as a grasper. As the colonoscopy is being performed the laparoscopic instruments are utilized to position the colon as needed to assist with advancement of the colonoscope. This is accomplished by placing counter pressure where the scope is turning or holding the colon in a way to reduce angulation.

The benefit is that a more aggressive technique may be employed to resect a colonic mass or polyp: An injury such as a perforation would be visualized and a repair could be attempted laparoscopically immediately.
