= Hyperplastic polyp =

Type of colorectal polyp

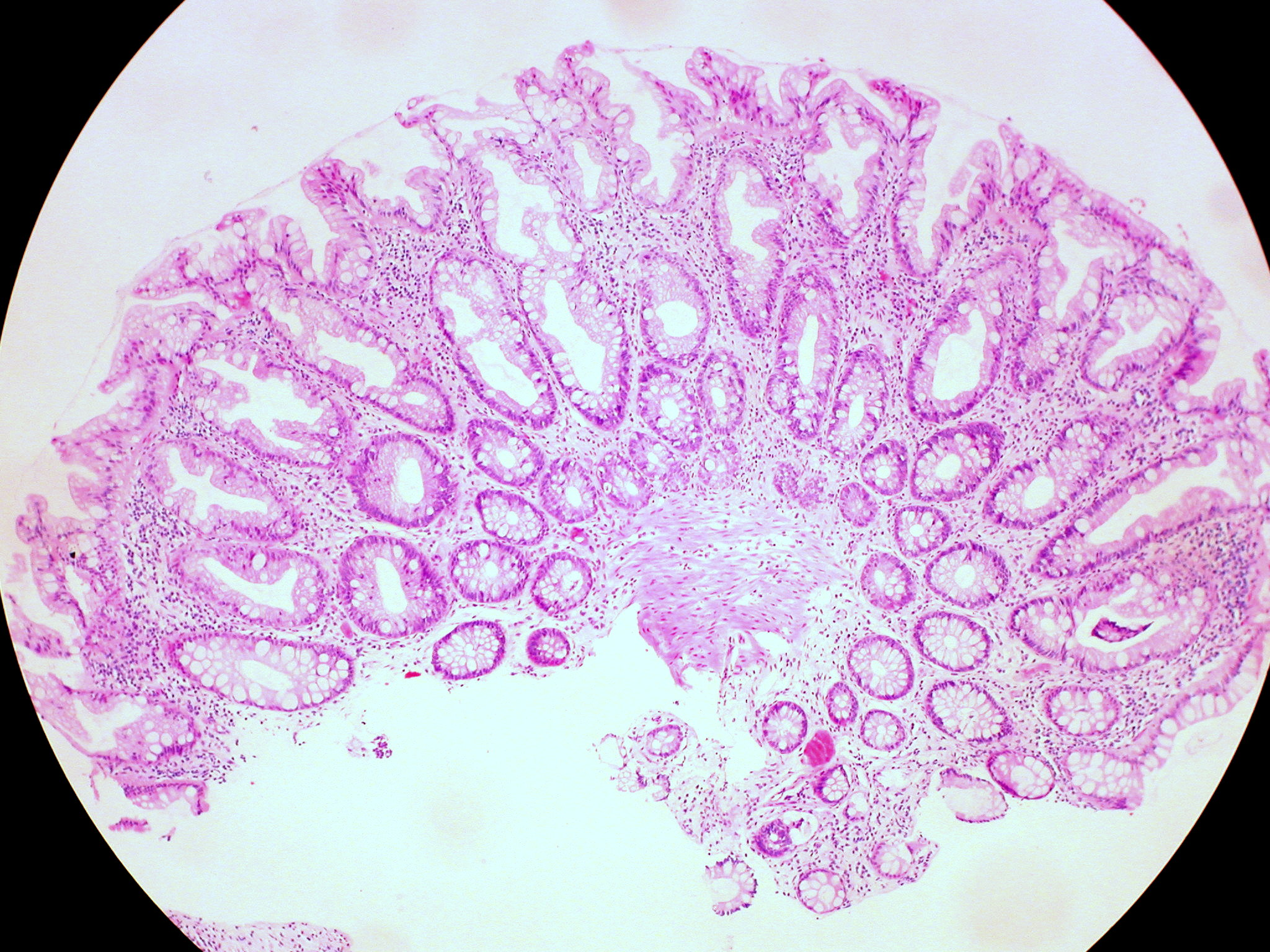
- Micrograph of hyperplastic polyp
- Specialty: Gastroenterology
- Symptoms: Usually asymptomatic
- Complications: Colorectal cancer
- Types: Microvesicular type Goblet cell–rich type
- Diagnostic method: Colonoscopy
- Differential diagnosis: Colorectal adenoma, Traditional serrated adenoma

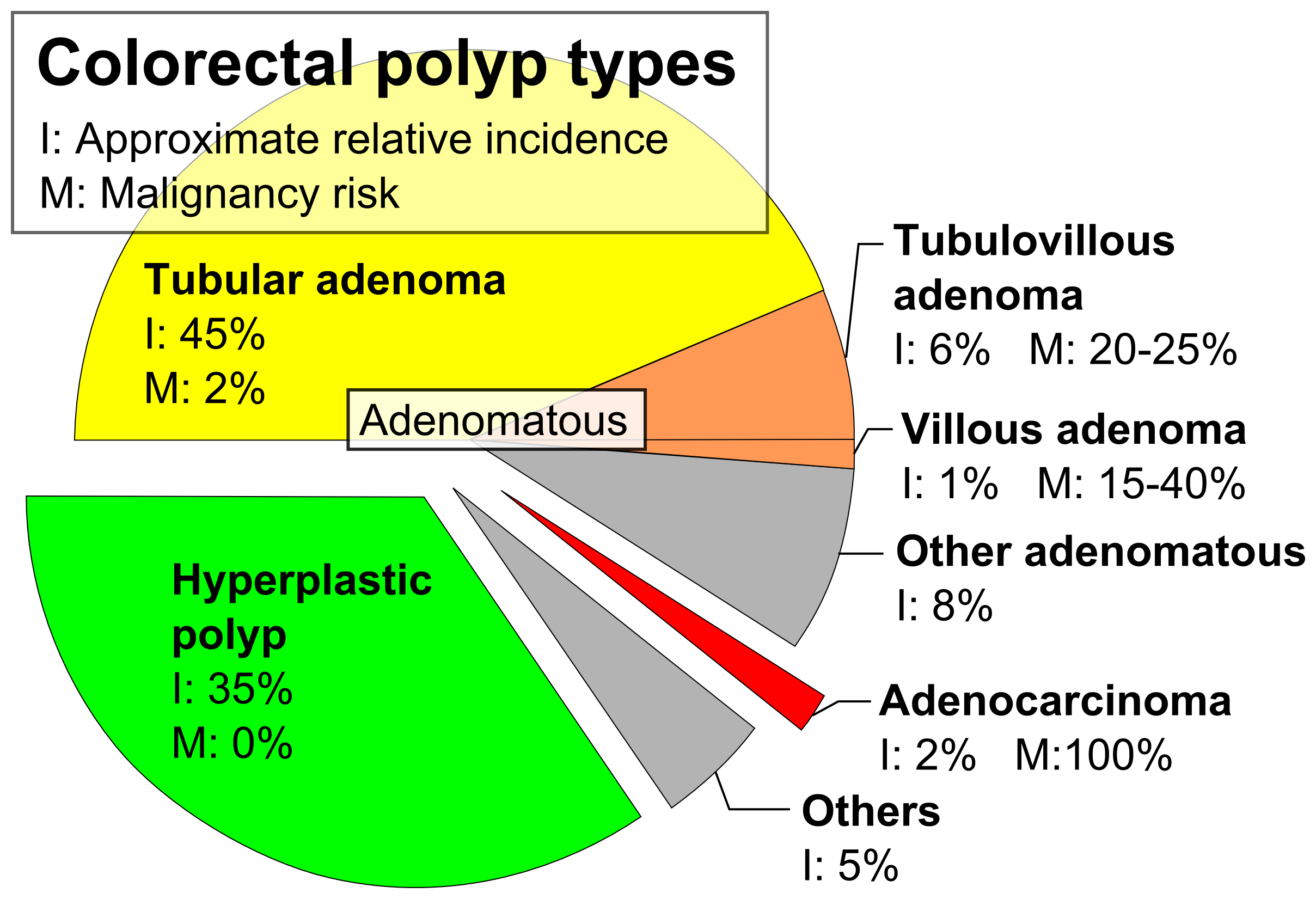
Incidences and malignancy risks of various types of colorectal polyps, with hyperplastic polyps at bottom left.

Hyperplastic polyps are a type of gastric or colorectal polyp, most commonly found in the distal colon and rectum. They are usually asymptomatic and are diagnosed via colonoscopy. Microscopically, they display a characteristic serrated ("saw-tooth") appearance with elongated, straight crypts.

Most hyperplastic polyps have no malignant potential and are no more likely than normal tissue to eventually become cancer. However, those found on the right side of the colon can exhibit malignant potential through multiple mutations affecting DNA-mismatch-repair pathways, leading to microsatellite instability and potential malignant transformation.

There are two main histological types: microvesicular mucin-rich type and goblet cell-rich type, which have genetic and structural differences but no significant clinical differences.

Serrated polyposis syndrome is a rare condition defined by the WHO as having numerous serrated lesions or polyps.

== Cancer risk ==
Most hyperplastic polyps are found in the distal colon and rectum. They have no malignant potential, which means that they are no more likely than normal tissue to eventually become a cancer.

Hyperplastic polyps on the right side of the colon do exhibit a malignant potential. This occurs through multiple mutations that affect the DNA-mismatch-repair pathways. As such DNA mutations during replication are not repaired. This leads to microsatellite instability which can eventually lead to malignant transformation in polyps on the right side of the colon.

== Serrated polyposis syndrome ==
Serrated polyposis syndrome is a rare condition that has been defined by the World Health Organization as either:

1. ≥5 serrated lesions/polyps proximal to the rectum, all ≥ 5 mm in size, with two lesions ≥10 mm
2. >20 serrated lesions/polyps of any size distributed throughout the large bowel with 5 proximal to the rectum.

== Histopathology ==
Histopathologically, there are two main types of hyperplastic polyps, which have genetic differences, as well as different histologic structure, but no significant differences clinically. The two main types of hyperplastic polyps are microvesicular mucin-rich type and goblet cell-rich type. A mucin-poor type with eosinophilic cytoplasm, which is rare, was previously described. However, the mucin poor type is no longer considered a distinct subtype.

=== Mucin-rich type ===
The luminal portion has a serrated ("saw tooth") appearance formed by tufts or folds of abundant apical cytoplasm. It contains glands with star-shaped lumina. There are crypts that are elongated but straight, narrow and hyperchromatic at the base. All crypts reach to the muscularis mucosae. The basement membrane is frequently thickened.

=== Goblet cell-rich type ===
Elongated, fat crypts and little to no serration. Therefore, they may not be obvious without comparing to adjacent normal intestinal wall.

They are filled with goblet cells, extending to surface, which commonly has a tufted appearance.

=== Epithelial misplacement ===
Infrequently, the epithelium is misplaced into the submucosa. Such polyps are termed "inverted hyperplastic polyps". They appear to be restricted to the sigmoid colon and rectum. The misplaced epithelium is mucin-depleted, similar to the basal one-third of the polyp. The misplacement is accompanied by the lamina propria and is continuous with the overlying polyp through a gap in the muscularis mucosae. It may require slices at multiple levels to demonstrate microscopically.

In such cases adjacent bleeding and hemosiderin deposition is common. Collagen type IV stain will have a strong continuous staining around nests.

=== Cellular structure ===
Nuclei are small, regular, round, and basal in the luminal half of the crypts, most reliably evaluated near the luminal surface.

There are proliferative changes at the base of crypts, where nuclei are enlarged, the nucleus/ cytoplasm ratio is elevated.

=== Immunohistochemistry ===
Immunohistochemistry using Ki-67 stains the basal 1 / 3 to 1 / 2 of crypts, indicating a proliferative zone.

CK20 is positive in the luminal 1 / 2 ~ 2 / 3 parts.

=== Differential diagnoses ===
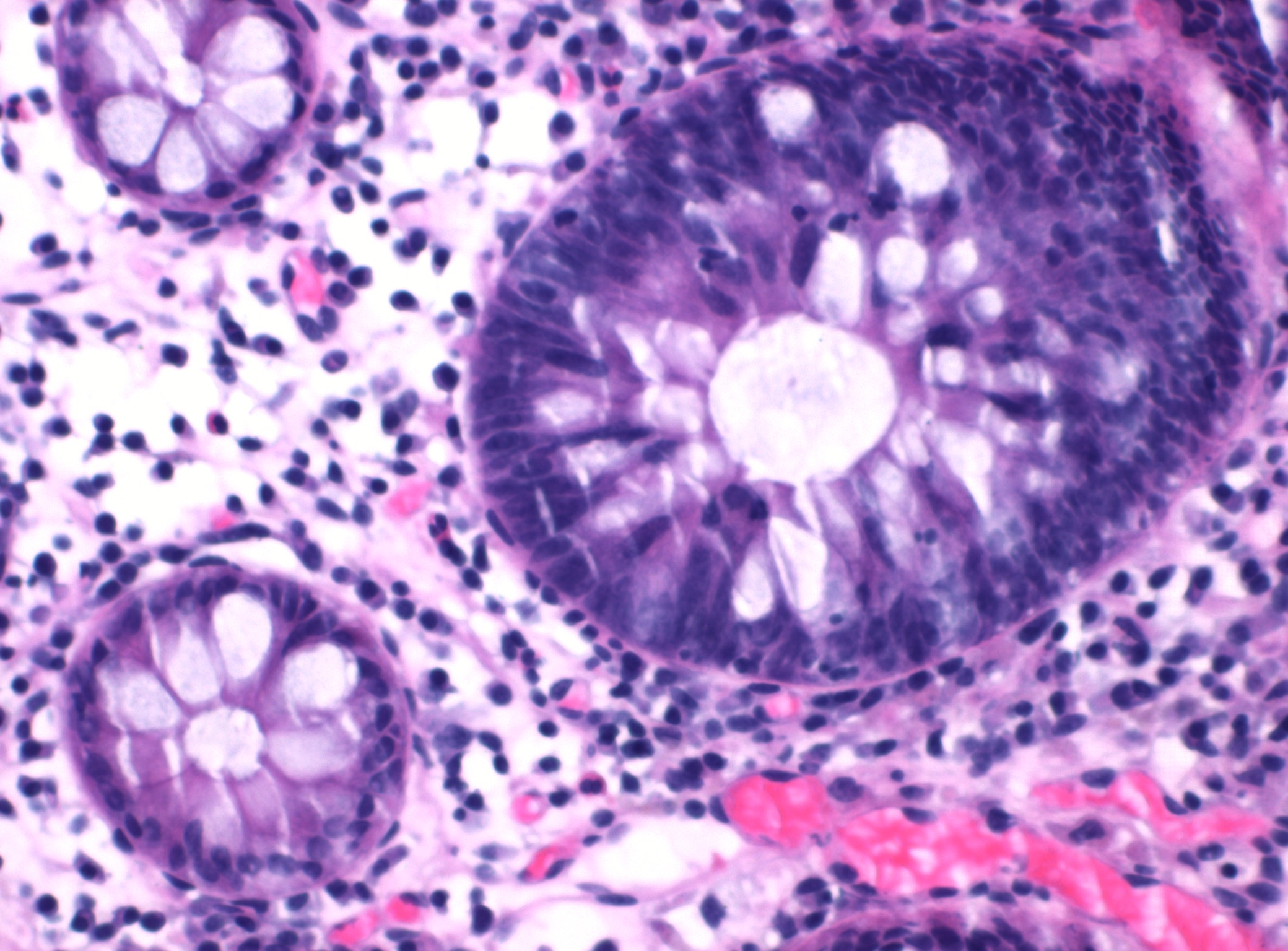
Non-proliferative (left) versus proliferative (large at right) colonic crypts, where the latter's proximity to the surface confers a diagnosis of a tubular colorectal adenoma.

The deep proliferative zones and reactive processes closely mimic changes seen in colorectal adenomas.

Features that distinguish a hyperplastic polyp from a tubular colorectal adenoma are as follows:

Hyperplastic Polyp	Tubular Adenoma
No dysplasia	Dysplasia
Proliferative epithelium restricted to base	Proliferative epithelium present at the surface
Gland lining cells mature at the surface	No surface maturation

A sessile serrated adenoma or traditional serrated adenoma is suspected if there is either of the following:

- Nuclear stratification
- Loss of polarity
- Dysplasia

A sessile serrated adenoma is suspected in case of any of the following:

- Size ≥0.5 cm
- Location in right colon

If both are present, it is almost always an SSA. Other features causing a suspicion for sessile serrated adenoma are:

- Dilation of crypts
- Branching of crypts
- Horizontal glands at the base
- Mature mucinous cells at the base of crypts
