= Juvenile polyp =

- Other names: Retention polyp
- Specialty: Gastroenterology
- Symptoms: Asymptomatic; Rectal bleeding Rectal prolapse
- Usual onset: Childhood
- Types: Solitary; Juvenile polyposis syndrome
- Diagnostic method: Colonoscopy
- Differential diagnosis: Hyperplastic polyp, Inflammatory polyp, Cowden syndrome Peutz-Jeghers syndrome
- Treatment: Polypectomy
- Frequency: 2% of children

Juvenile polyps are a type of polyp found in the colon. While juvenile polyps are typically found in children, they may be found in people of any age. Juvenile polyps are a type of hamartomatous polyps, which consist of a disorganized mass of tissue. They occur in about two percent of children. Juvenile polyps often do not cause symptoms (asymptomatic); when present, symptoms usually include gastrointestinal bleeding and prolapse through the rectum. Removal of the polyp (polypectomy) is warranted when symptoms are present, for treatment and definite histopathological diagnosis. In the absence of symptoms, removal is not necessary. Recurrence of polyps following removal is relatively common. Juvenile polyps are usually sporadic, occurring in isolation, although they may occur as a part of juvenile polyposis syndrome. Sporadic juvenile polyps may occur in any part of the colon, but are usually found in the distal colon (rectum and sigmoid). In contrast to other types of colon polyps, juvenile polyps are not premalignant and are not usually associated with a higher risk of cancer; however, individuals with juvenile polyposis syndrome are at increased risk of gastric and colorectal cancer. Unlike juvenile polyposis syndrome, solitary juvenile polyps do not require follow up with surveillance colonoscopy.

== Signs and symptoms ==
Juvenile polyps often do not cause symptoms (asymptomatic); when present, symptoms usually include gastrointestinal bleeding and prolapse through the rectum. Juvenile polyps are usually sporadic, occurring in isolation, although they may occur as a part of juvenile polyposis syndrome. Sporadic juvenile polyps may occur in any part of the colon, but are usually found in the distal colon (rectum and sigmoid).

== Histopathology ==
Under microscopy, juvenile polyps are characterized by cystic architecture, mucus-filled glands, and prominent lamina propria. Inflammatory cells may be present. Compared with sporadic polyps, polyps that occur in juvenile polyposis syndrome tend to have more of a frond-like (resembling a leaf) growth pattern with fewer stroma, fewer dilated glands and smaller glands with more proliferation. Syndrome-related juvenile polyps also demonstrate more neoplasia and increased COX-2 expression compared with sporadic juvenile polyps.

== Diagnosis ==
Juvenile polyps are diagnosed by examination of their distinctive histopathology, generally after polypectomy via endoscopy. Juvenile polyps cause fecal calprotectin level to be elevated.

== Treatment ==
If symptoms are present, then removal of the polyp (polypectomy) is warranted. Recurrence of polyps following removal is relatively common. Unlike juvenile polyposis syndrome, solitary juvenile polyps do not require follow up with surveillance colonoscopy.

== Epidemiology ==
Juvenile polyps occur in about 2 percent of children. In contrast to other types of colon polyps, juvenile polyps are not premalignant and are not usually associated with a higher risk of cancer; however, individuals with juvenile polyposis syndrome are at increased risk of gastric and colorectal cancer.
