= Colorectal adenoma =

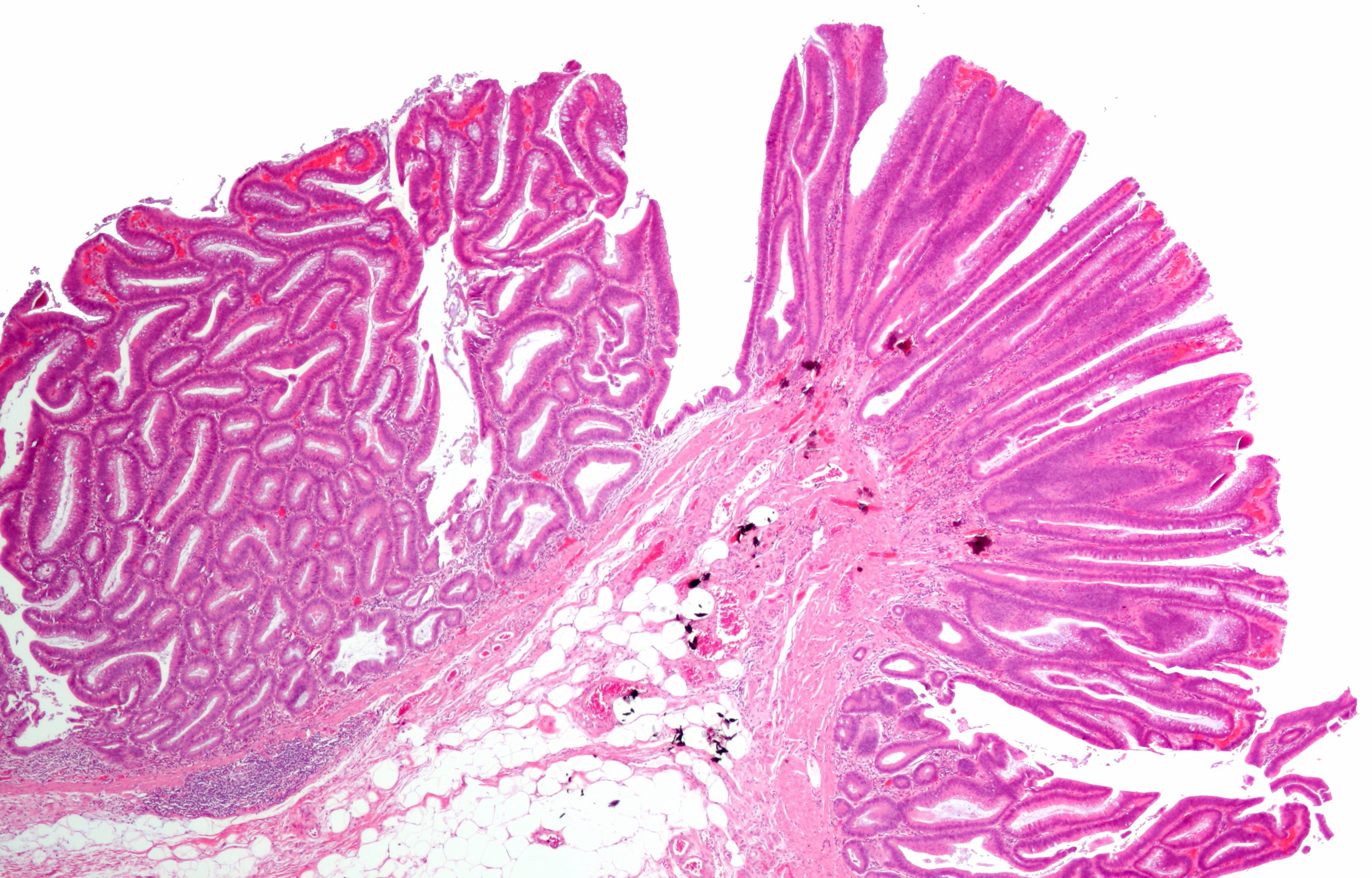
- Tubulovillous adenoma (tubular component – left of image, villous component – right of image). H&E stain.
- Specialty: Gastroenterology
- Symptoms: Asymptomatic, rectal bleeding
- Complications: Colorectal cancer
- Diagnostic method: Colonoscopy
- Treatment: Polypectomy

The colorectal adenoma is a benign glandular tumor of the colon and the rectum. It is a precursor lesion of the colorectal adenocarcinoma (colon cancer). They often manifest as colorectal polyps.

== Comparison table ==
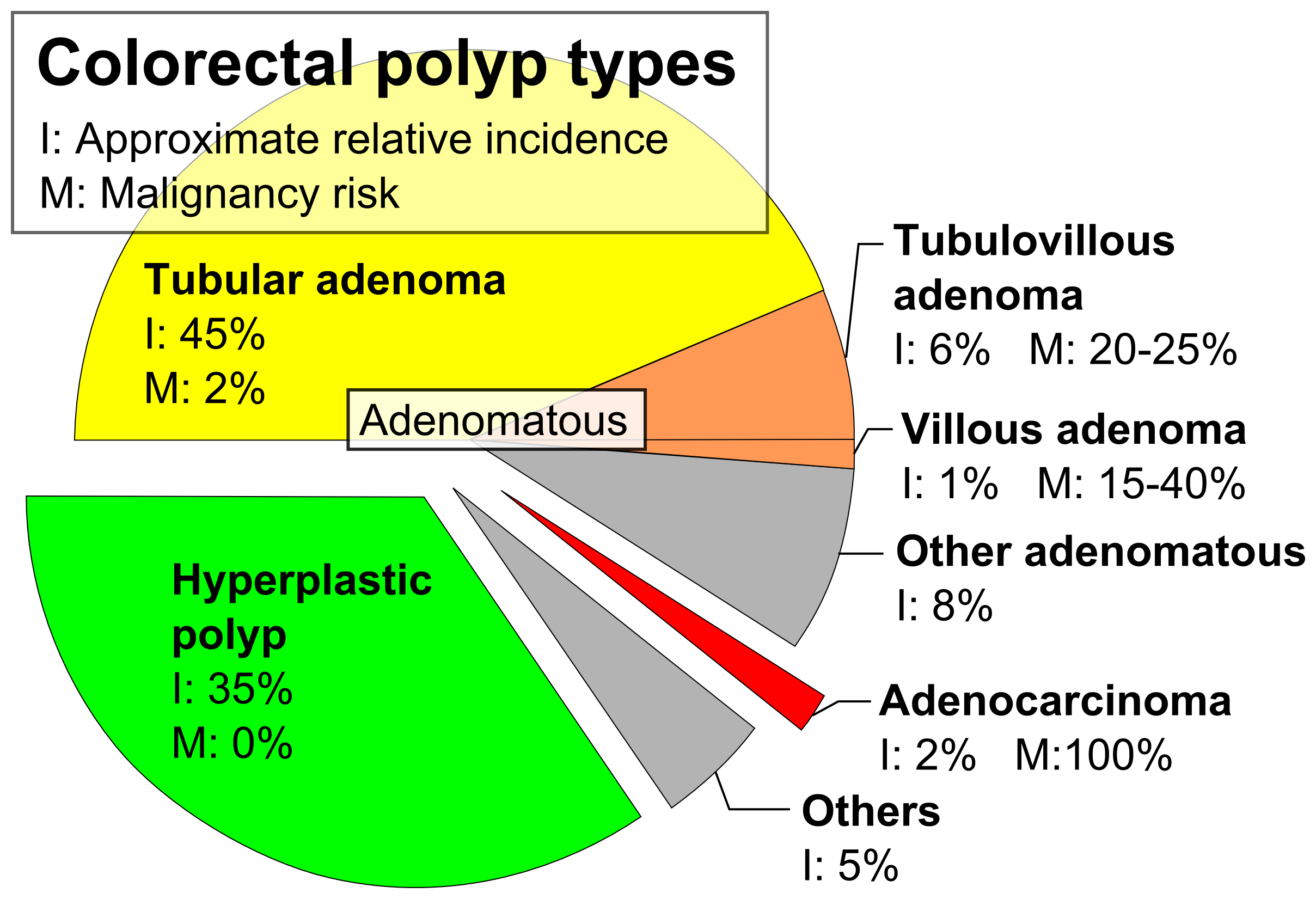
Incidences and malignancy risks of various types of colorectal polyps. Adenomatous types are grouped at top.

Colorectal adenoma
Type	Risk of containing malignant cells	Histopathology definition
Tubular adenoma	2% at 1.5 cm	Over 75% of volume has tubular appearance.
Tubulovillous adenoma	20% to 25%	25–75% villous
Villous adenoma	15% to 40%	Over 75% villous
Sessile serrated adenoma (SSA)		Basal dilation of the crypts; Basal crypt serration; Crypts that run horizontal to the basement membrane (horizontal crypts); Crypt branching.

== Tubular adenoma ==
In contrast to hyperplastic polyps, these display dysplasia.

== Tubulovillous adenoma ==
Tubulovillous adenoma, TVA are considered to have a higher risk of becoming malignant (cancerous) than tubular adenomas.

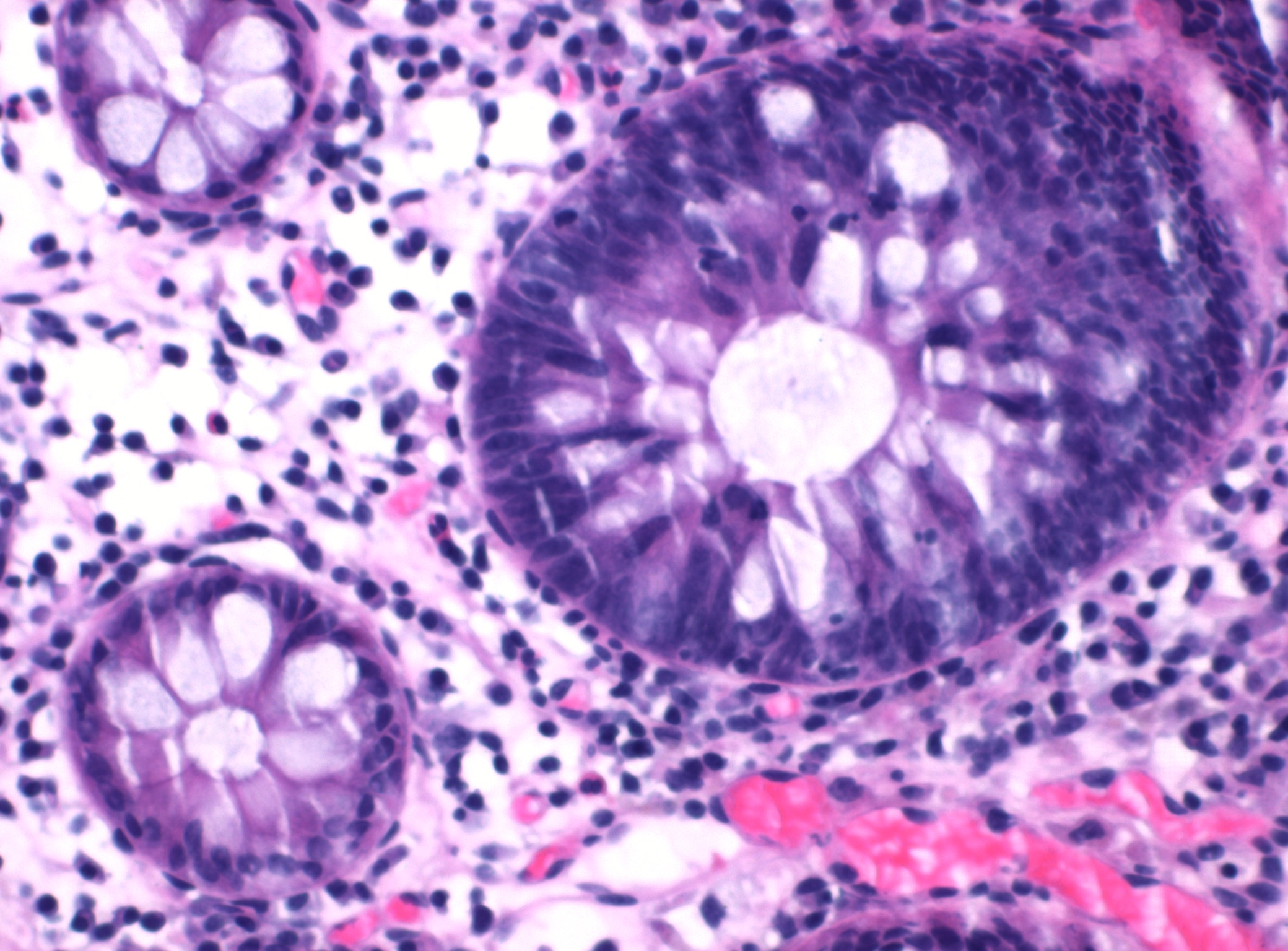
Normal (left) versus dysplastic (large at right) colonic crypts, the latter conferring a diagnosis of a tubular and/or villous adenoma.

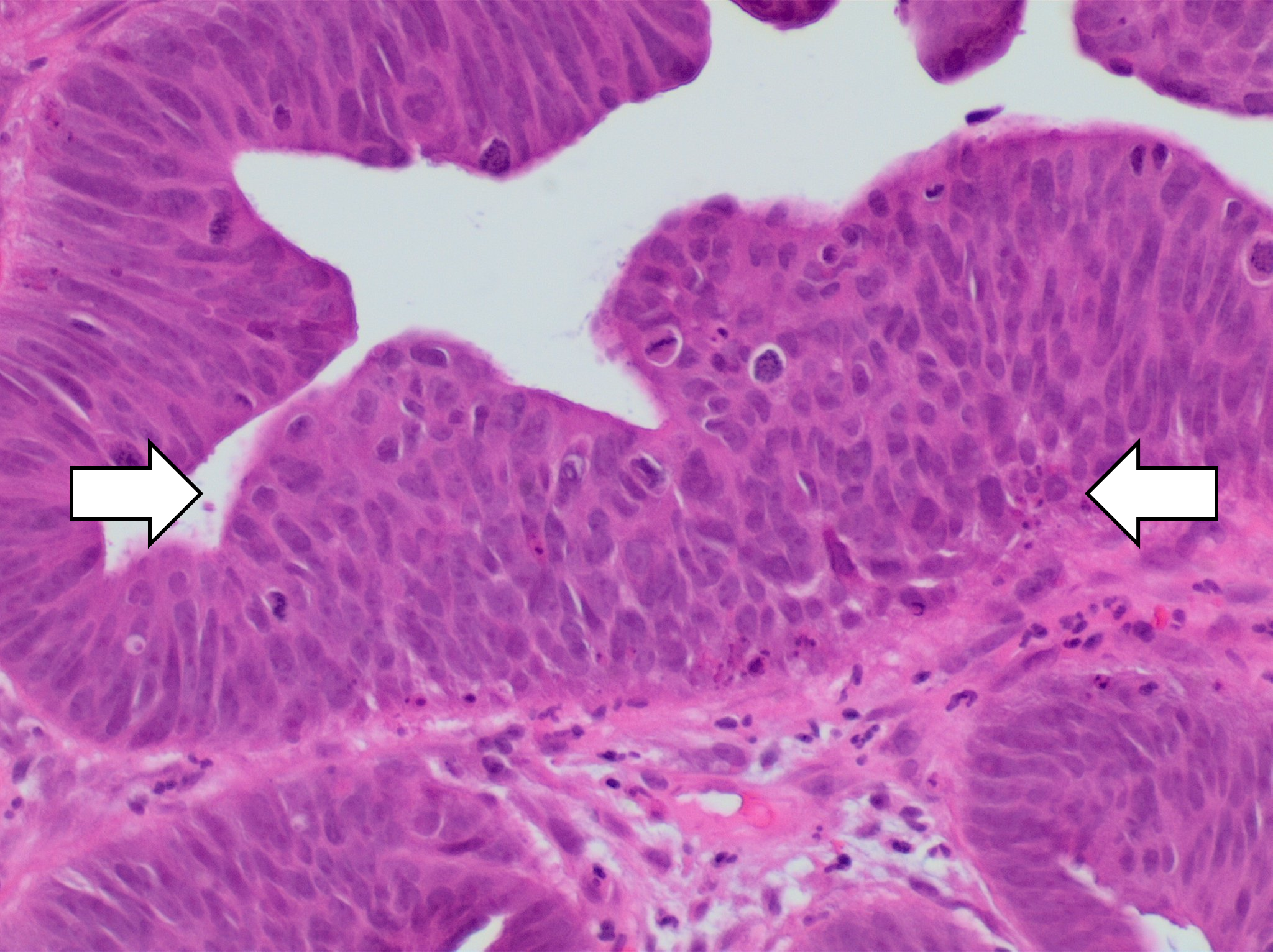
Histopathology of high-grade dysplasia in a tubulovillous adenoma, in this case seen mainly as loss of cell polarity, as cells become more plump and haphazard than the elongated and parallel nuclei of surrounding low-grade dysplasia.

== Villous adenoma ==
Micrograph of a colorectal villous adenoma. H&E stain

These adenomas may become malignant (cancerous). Villous adenomas have been demonstrated to contain malignant portions in about 15–25% of cases, approaching 40% in those over 4 cm in diameter. Colonic resection may be required for large lesions. These can also lead to secretory diarrhea with large volume liquid stools with few formed elements. They are commonly described as secreting large amounts of mucus, resulting in hypokalaemia in patients. On endoscopy, a "cauliflower' like mass is described due to villi stretching. Being an adenoma, the mass is covered in columnar epithelial cells.

== Sessile serrated adenoma ==
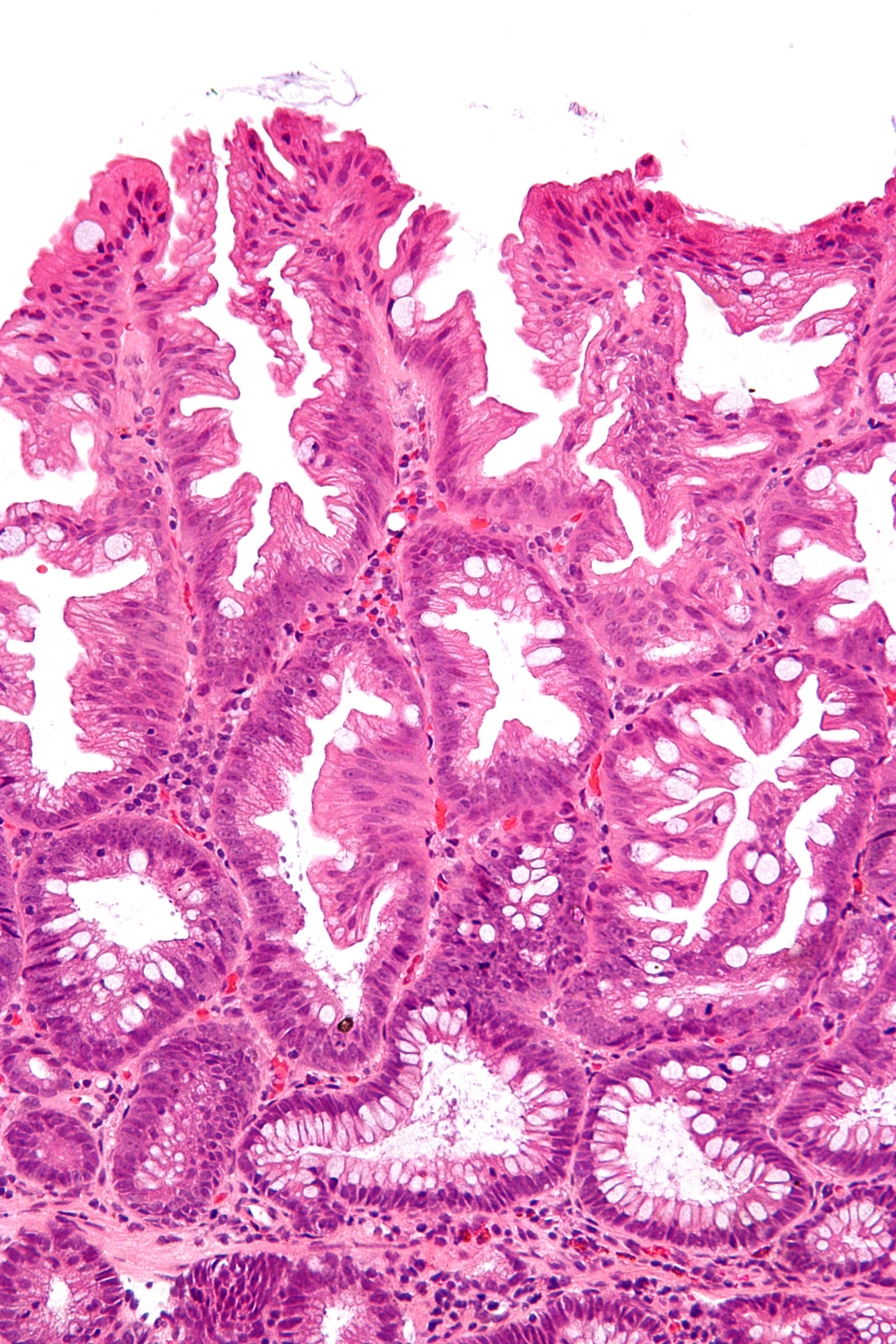
Micrograph of a sessile serrated adenoma. H&E stain

Sessile serrated adenomas are characterized by (1) basal dilation of the crypts, (2) basal crypt serration, (3) crypts that run horizontal to the basement membrane (horizontal crypts), and (4) crypt branching. The most common of these features is basal dilation of the crypts.

== See also ==
- Colorectal cancer
- Colorectal polyp
