= Colorectal polyp =

Growth found in bowel wall

Colon polyps
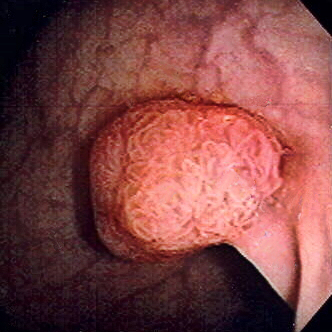
- Polyp of sigmoid colon as revealed by colonoscopy. Approximately 1 cm in diameter. The polyp was removed by snare cautery.
- Specialty: Gastroenterology

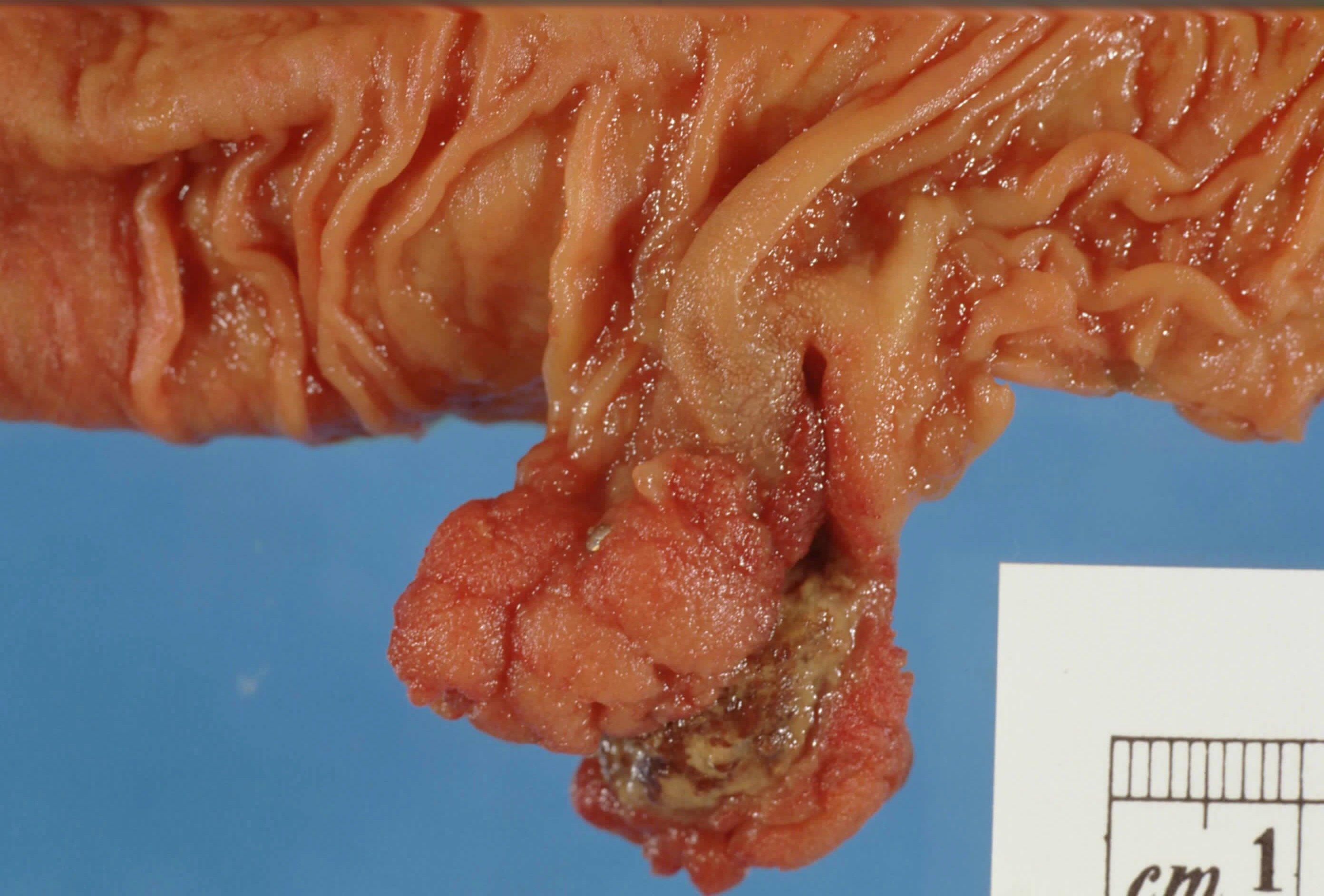
Adenomatous colon polyp with malignant focus at apex

A colorectal polyp is a polyp (fleshy growth) occurring on the lining of the colon or rectum. Untreated colorectal polyps can develop into colorectal cancer.

Colorectal polyps are often classified by their behaviour (i.e. benign vs. malignant) or cause (e.g. as a consequence of inflammatory bowel disease). They may be benign (e.g. hyperplastic polyp), pre-malignant (e.g. tubular adenoma) or malignant (e.g. colorectal adenocarcinoma).

== Signs and symptoms ==
Colorectal polyps are not usually associated with symptoms. When they occur, symptoms include bloody stools; changes in frequency or consistency of stools (such as a week or more of constipation or diarrhoea); and fatigue arising from blood loss. Anemia arising from iron deficiency can also present due to chronic blood loss, even in the absence of bloody stools. Another symptom may be an increased mucus production especially those involving villous adenomas. Copious production of mucus causes loss of potassium that can occasionally result in symptomatic hypokalemia. Occasionally, if a polyp is big enough to cause a bowel obstruction, there may be nausea, vomiting and severe constipation.

== Structure ==
Polyps are either pedunculated (attached to the intestinal wall by a stalk) or sessile (grow directly from the wall). In addition to the gross appearance categorization, they are further divided by their histologic appearance as tubular adenomas which are tubular glands, villous adenomas which are long finger-like projections on the surface, and tubulovillous adenomas which have features of both.

== Genetics ==
Hereditary syndromes causing increased colorectal polyp formation include:

- Familial adenomatous polyposis (FAP)
- Hereditary nonpolyposis colorectal cancer
- Peutz–Jeghers syndrome
- Juvenile polyposis syndrome

Several genes have been associated with polyposis, such as GREM1, MSH3, MLH3, NTHL1, RNF43 and RPS20.

=== Familial adenomatous polyposis ===
Familial adenomatous polyposis (FAP) is a form of hereditary cancer syndrome involving mutations in one of two genes. FAP and attenuated FAP (originally called hereditary flat adenoma syndrome) are caused by APC gene defects on chromosome 5 while autosomal recessive FAP (or MUTYH-associated polyposis) is caused by defects in the MUTYH gene on chromosome 1.. The syndrome was first described in 1863 by Virchow on a 15-year-old boy with multiple polyps in his colon. The syndrome involves development of multiple polyps at an early age and those left untreated will all eventually develop cancer. The gene is expressed 100% in those with the mutation and it is autosomal dominant. 10–20% of patients have negative family history and acquire the syndrome from spontaneous germline mutation. The average age of newly diagnosed patient is 29 and the average age of newly discovered colorectal cancer is 39. It is recommended that those affected undergo colorectal cancer screening at younger age with treatment and prevention are surgical with removal of affected tissues.

=== Hereditary nonpolyposis colorectal cancer (Lynch syndrome) ===
Hereditary nonpolyposis colorectal cancer (HNPCC, also known as Lynch syndrome) is a hereditary colorectal cancer syndrome. It is the most common hereditary form of colorectal cancer in the United States and accounts for about 3% of all cases of cancer. It was first recognized by Alder S. Warthin in 1885 at the University of Michigan. It was later further studied by Henry Lynch who recognized an autosomal dominant transmission pattern with those affected having relatively early onset of cancer (mean age 44 years), greater occurrence of proximal lesions, mostly mucinous or poorly differentiated adenocarcinoma, greater number of synchronous and metachronous cancer cells, and good outcome after surgical intervention. The Amsterdam Criteria were initially used to define Lynch syndrome before the underlying genetic mechanism had been worked out. The Criteria required that the patient has three family members all first-degree relatives with colorectal cancer that involves at least two generations with at least one affected person being younger than 50 years of age when the diagnosis was made. The Amsterdam Criteria is too restrictive and was later expanded to include cancers of endometrial, ovarian, gastric, pancreatic, small intestinal, ureteral, and renal pelvic origin. The increased risk of cancer seen in patients with by the syndrome is associated with dysfunction of DNA repair mechanism. Molecular biologists have linked the syndrome to specific genes such as hMSH2, hMSH1, hMSH6, and hPMS2.

=== Peutz–Jeghers syndrome ===
Peutz–Jeghers syndrome is an autosomal dominant syndrome that presents with hamartomatous polyps, which are disorganized growth of tissues of the intestinal tract, and hyperpigmentation of the interlining of the mouth, lips and fingers. The syndrome was first noted in 1896 by Hutchinson, and later separately described by Peutz, and then again in 1940 by Jeghers. The syndrome is associated with malfunction of serine-threonine kinase 11 or STK 11 gene, and has a 2–10% increase in risk of developing cancer of the intestinal tract. The syndrome also causes increased risk of extraintestinal cancer such as that involving breast, ovary, cervix, fallopian tubes, thyroid, lung, gallbladder, bile ducts, pancreas, and testicles. The polyps often bleeds and may cause obstruction that would require surgery. Any polyp larger than 1.5 cm needs removal and patients should be monitored closely and screen every two years for malignancy.

=== Juvenile polyposis syndrome ===
Juvenile polyposis syndrome is an autosomal dominant syndrome characterized by increased risk of cancer of intestinal tract and extraintestinal cancer. It often presents with bleeding and obstruction of the intestinal tract along with low serum albumin due to protein loss in the intestine. The syndrome is linked to malfunction of SMAD4 a tumor suppression gene that is seen in 50% of cases. Individuals with multiple juvenile polyps have at least 10% chance of developing malignancy and should undergo abdominal colectomy with ileorectal anastomosis, and close monitoring via endoscopy of rectum. For individuals with few juvenile polyps, patients should undergo endoscopic polypectomy.

== Types ==
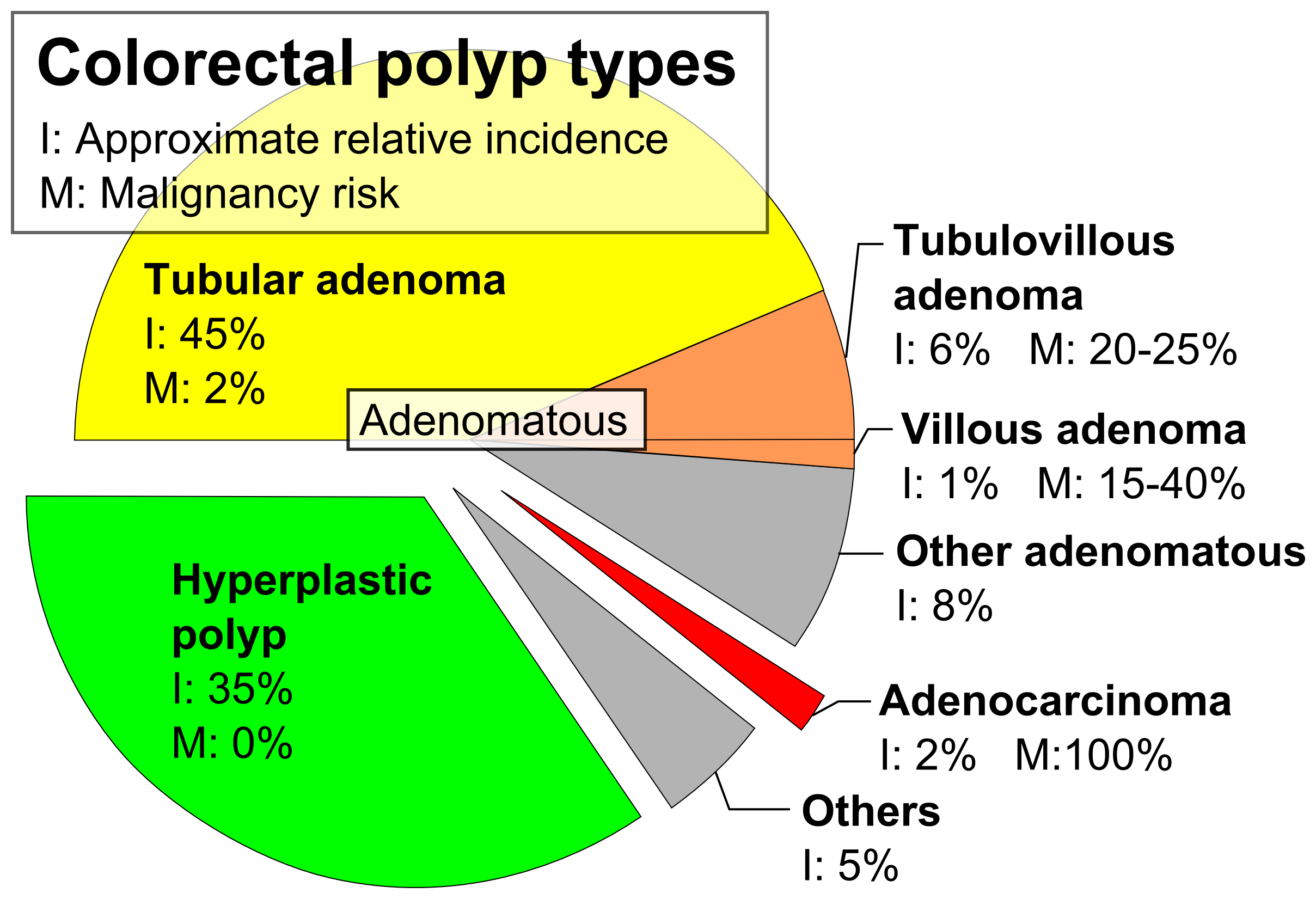
Incidences and malignancy risks of various types of colorectal polyps

Colorectal polyps can broadly be classified as follows:

- hyperplastic,
- neoplastic (adenomatous and malignant),
- hamartomatous and,
- inflammatory.

=== Comparison table ===
Colorectal polyps
Type	Risk of containing malignant cells	Histopathology		Image
Hyperplastic polyp	0%	No dysplasia.: Mucin-rich type: Serrated ("saw tooth") appearance, containing glands with star-shaped lumina. Crypts that are elongated but straight, narrow and hyperchromatic at the base. All crypts reach to the muscularis mucosae.; Goblet cell-rich type: Elongated, fat crypts and little to no serration. Filled with goblet cells, extending to surface, which commonly has a tufted appearance.		
Tubular adenoma	2% at 1.5 cm	Low to high grade dysplasia	Over 75% of volume has tubular appearance.	
Tubulovillous adenoma	20% to 25%	Low to high grade dysplasia	25–75% villous	
Villous adenoma	15% to 40%	Low to high grade dysplasia	Over 75% villous	
Sessile serrated adenoma (SSA)		Basal dilation of the crypts; Basal crypt serration; Crypts that run horizontal to the basement membrane (horizontal crypts); Crypt branching.		
Colorectal adenocarcinoma	100%	In carcinoma in situ (Tis): cancer cells invading into the lamina propria, and may involve but not penetrate the muscularis mucosae. Can be classified as "high-grade dysplasia", because prognosis and management are essentially the same.; Invasive adenocarcinoma: Extending through the muscularis mucosae into the submucosa and beyond.		

=== Hyperplastic polyp ===
Most hyperplastic polyps are found in the distal colon and rectum. They have no malignant potential, which means that they are no more likely than normal tissue to eventually become a cancer.

=== Neoplastic polyp ===
A neoplasm is a tissue whose cells have lost normal differentiation. They can be either benign growths or malignant growths. The malignant growths can either have primary or secondary causes. Adenomatous polyps are considered precursors to cancer and cancer becomes invasive once malignant cells cross the muscularis mucosa and invade the cells below. Any cellular changes seen above the lamina propria are considered non-invasive and are labeled atypia or dysplasia. Any invasive carcinoma that has penetrated the muscularis mocos has the potential for lymph node metastasis and local recurrence which will require more aggressive and extensive resection. The Haggitt's criteria is used for classification of polyps containing cancer and is based on the depth of penetration. The Haggitt's criteria has level 0 through level 4, with all invasive carcinoma of sessile polyp variant by definition being classified as level 4.

- Level 0: Cancer does not penetrate through the muscularis mucosa.
- Level 1: Cancer penetrates through the muscularis mucosa and invades the submucosa below but is limited to the head of the polyp.
- Level 2: Cancer invades through with involvement of the neck of polyp.
- Level 3: Cancer invades through with involvement of any parts of the stalk.
- Level 4: Cancer invades through the submucosa below the stalk of the polyp but above the muscularis propria of the bowel wall.

==== Adenomas ====
Neoplastic polyps of the bowel are often benign hence called adenomas. An adenoma is a tumor of glandular tissue, that has not (yet) gained the properties of cancer.

The common adenomas of the colon (colorectal adenoma) are the tubular, tubulovillous, villous, and sessile serrated (SSA). A large majority (65–80%) are of the benign tubular type with 10–25% being tubulovillous, and villous being the most rare at 5–10%.

As is evident from their name, sessile serrated and traditional serrated adenomas (TSAs) have a serrated appearance and can be difficult to distinguish microscopically from hyperplastic polyps. Making this distinction is important, however, since SSAs and TSAs have the potential to become cancers, while hyperplastic polyps do not.

The villous subdivision is associated with the highest malignant potential because they generally have the largest surface area. (This is because the villi are projections into the lumen and hence have a bigger surface area.) However, villous adenomas are no more likely than tubular or tubulovillous adenomas to become cancerous if their sizes are all the same.

=== Hamartomatous polyp ===
Hamartomatous polyps are tumours, like growths found in organs as a result of faulty development. They are normally made up of a mixture of tissues. They contain mucus-filled glands, with retention cysts, abundant connective tissue, and chronic cellular infiltration of eosinophils. They grow at the normal rate of the host tissue and rarely cause problems such as compression. A common example of a hamartomatous lesion is a strawberry naevus. Hamartomatous polyps are often found by chance; occurring in syndromes such as Peutz–Jegher syndrome or juvenile polyposis syndrome.

Peutz–Jeghers syndrome is associated with polyps of the GI tract and also increased pigmentation around the lips, genitalia, buccal mucosa, feet, and hands. People are often diagnosed with Peutz–Jegher after presenting at around the age of nine with an intussusception. The polyps themselves carry little malignant potential but because of potential coexisting adenomas there is a 15% chance of colonic malignancy.

Juvenile polyps are hamartomatous polyps that often become evident before twenty years of age, but can also be seen in adults. They are usually solitary polyps found in the rectum which most commonly present with rectal bleeding. Juvenile polyposis syndrome is characterised by the presence of more than five polyps in the colon or rectum, or numerous juvenile polyps throughout the gastrointestinal tract, or any number of juvenile polyps in any person with a family history of juvenile polyposis. People with juvenile polyposis have an increased risk of colon cancer.

=== Inflammatory polyp ===
These are polyps that are associated with inflammatory conditions such as ulcerative colitis and Crohn's disease.

== Prevention ==
Diet and lifestyle are believed to play a large role in whether colorectal polyps form. Studies show there to be a protective link between consumption of cooked green vegetables, brown rice, legumes, and dried fruit and decreased incidence of colorectal polyps.

== Diagnosis ==
Colorectal polyps can be detected using a faecal occult blood test, flexible sigmoidoscopy, colonoscopy, virtual colonoscopy, digital rectal examination, barium enema or a pill camera.

Malignant potential is associated with

- degree of dysplasia
- Type of polyp (e.g. villous adenoma):
  - Tubular adenoma: 5% risk of cancer
  - Tubulovillous adenoma: 20% risk of cancer
  - Villous adenoma: 40% risk of cancer
- Size of polyp:
  - <1 cm =<1% risk of cancer
  - 1–2 cm=10% risk of cancer
  - >2 cm=50% risk of cancer

Normally an adenoma that is greater than 0.5 cm is treated.

=== Gallery ===
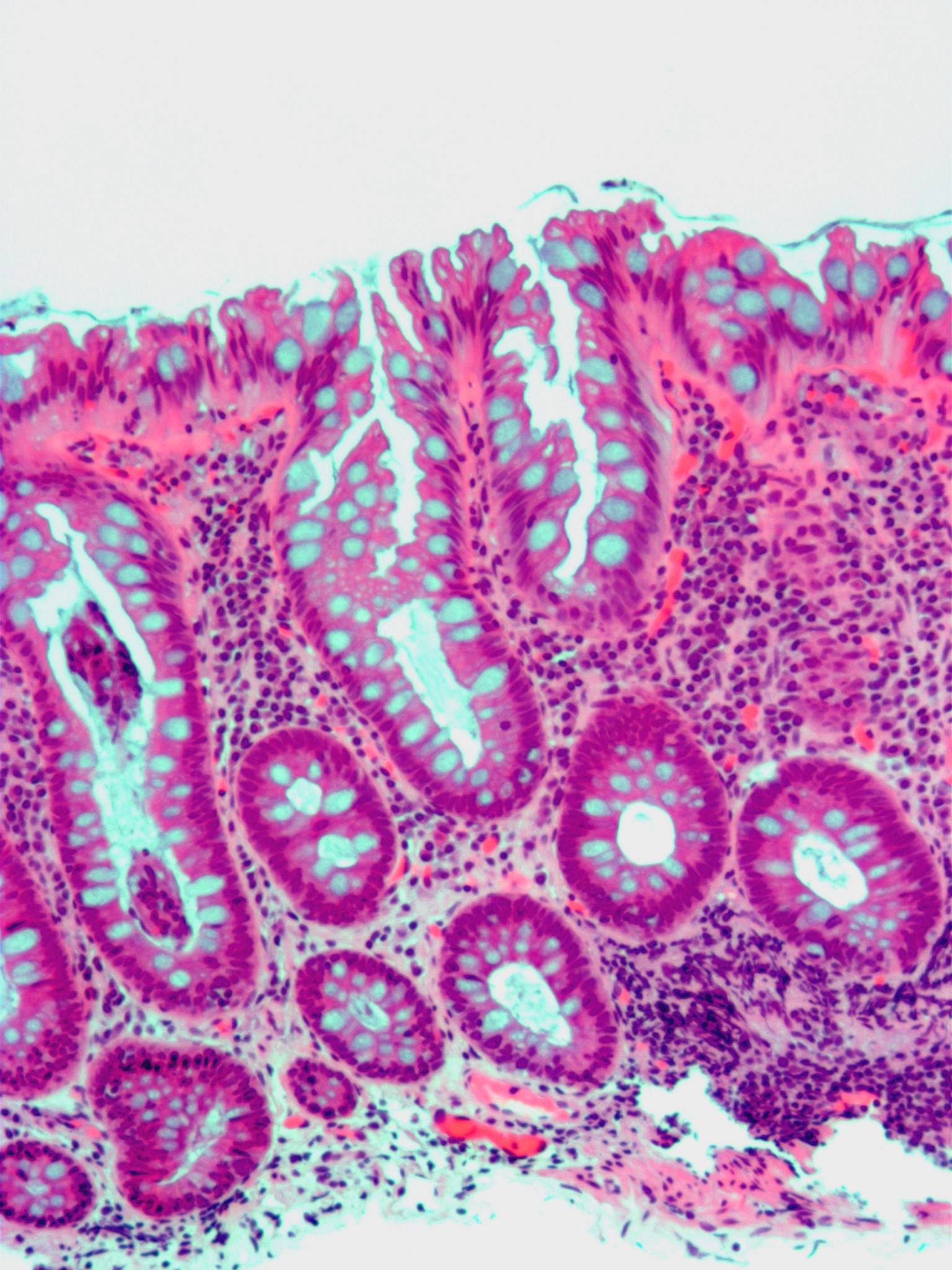
Microvesicular hyperplastic polyp. H&E stain.

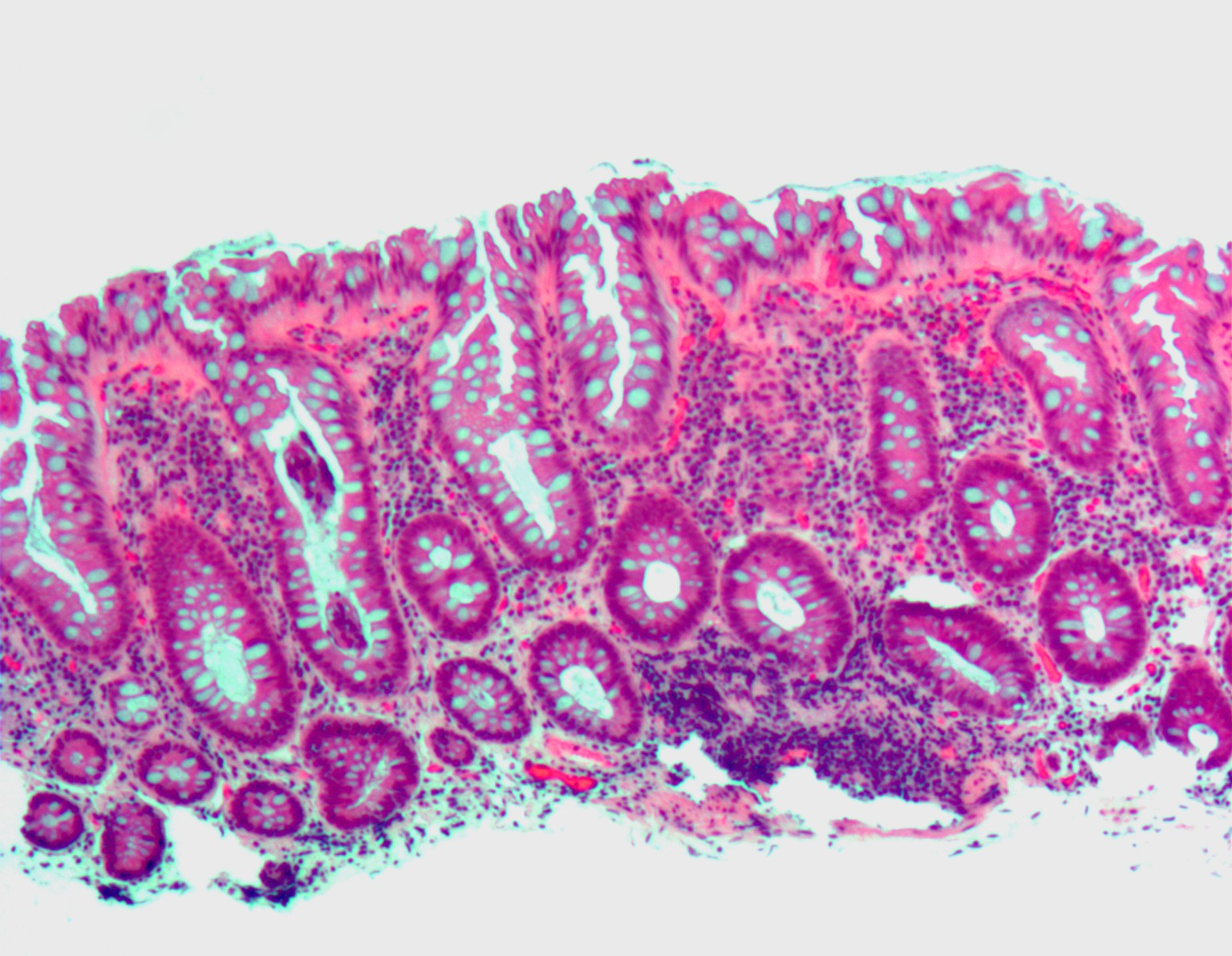
Microvesicular hyperplastic polyp. H&E stain.

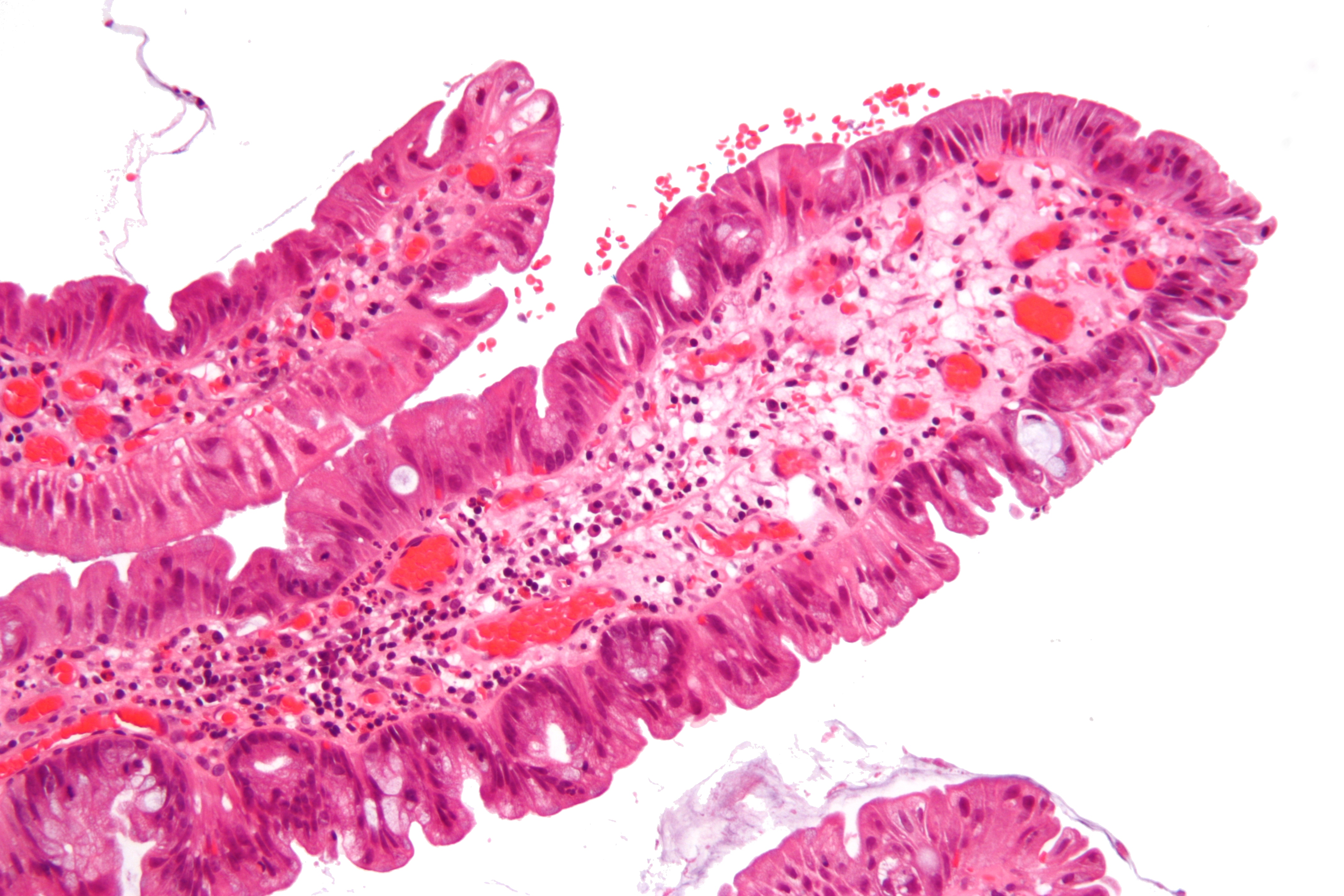
Traditional serrated adenoma. H&E stain.

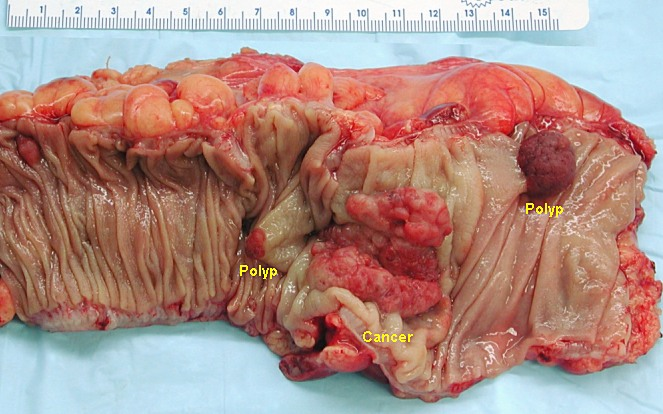
Gross appearance of a colectomy specimen containing two colorectal polyps and one invasive colorectal carcinoma

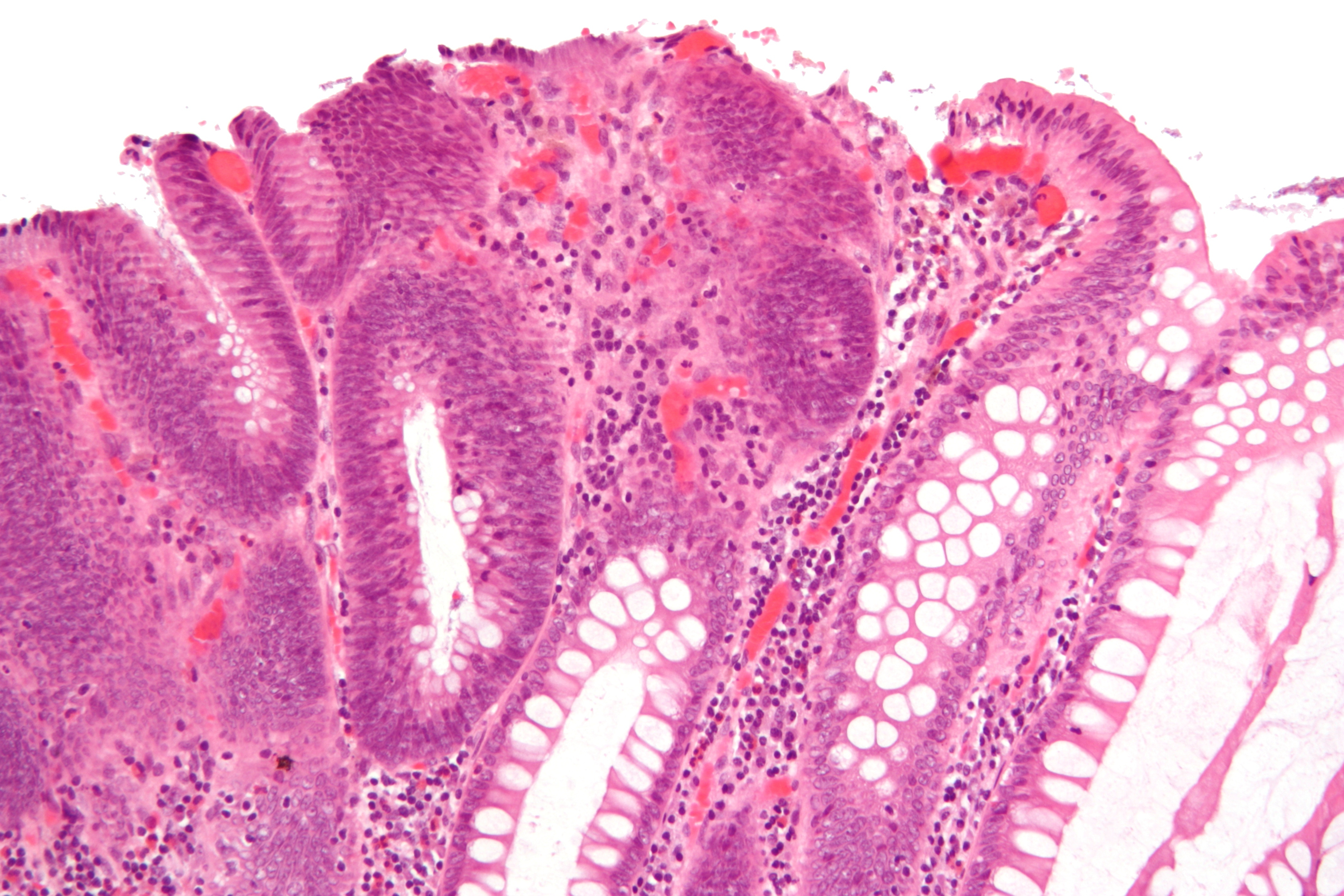
Micrograph of a tubular adenoma, the most common type of dysplastic polyp in the colon

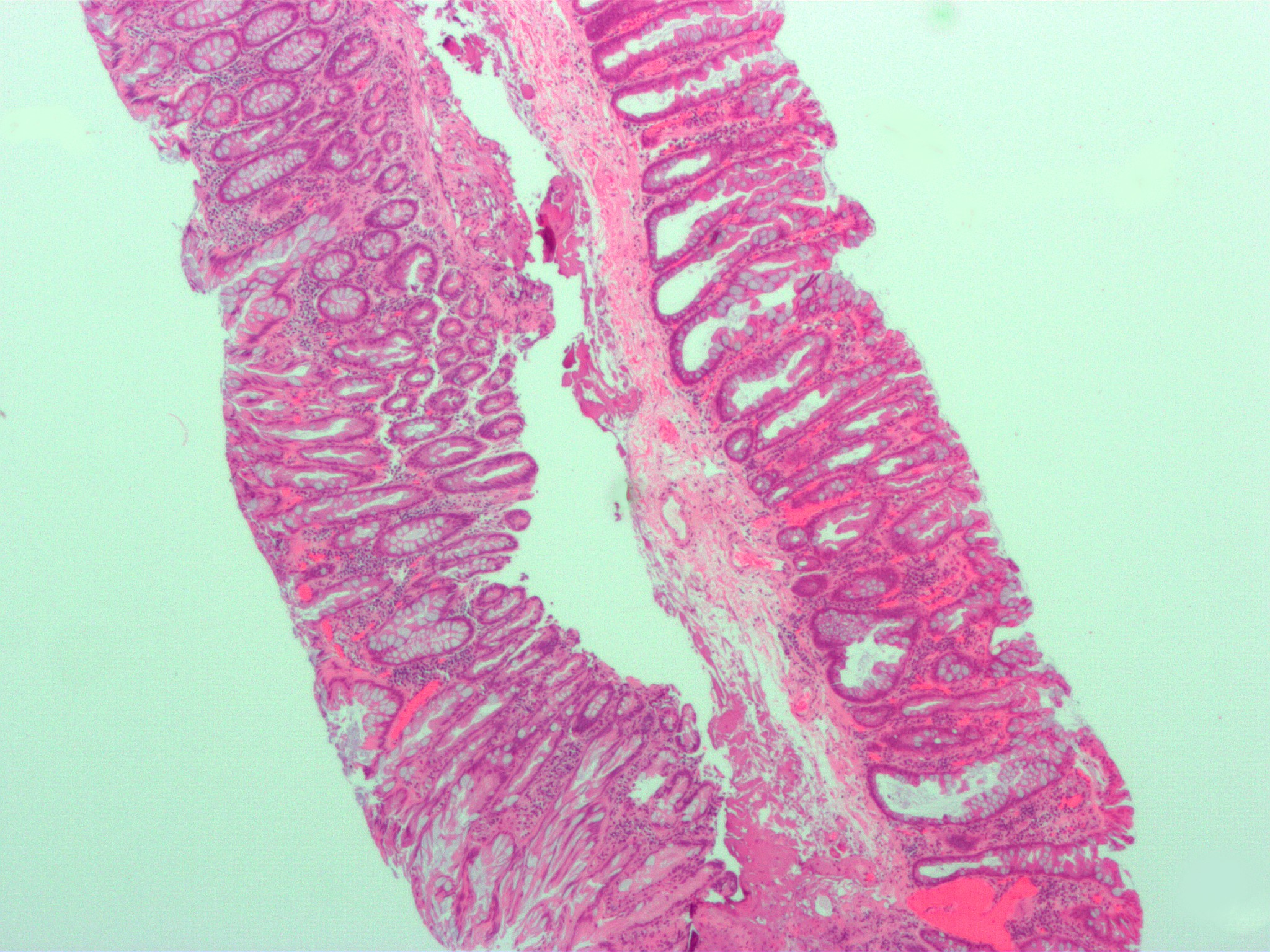
Micrograph of a sessile serrated adenoma. H&E stain.

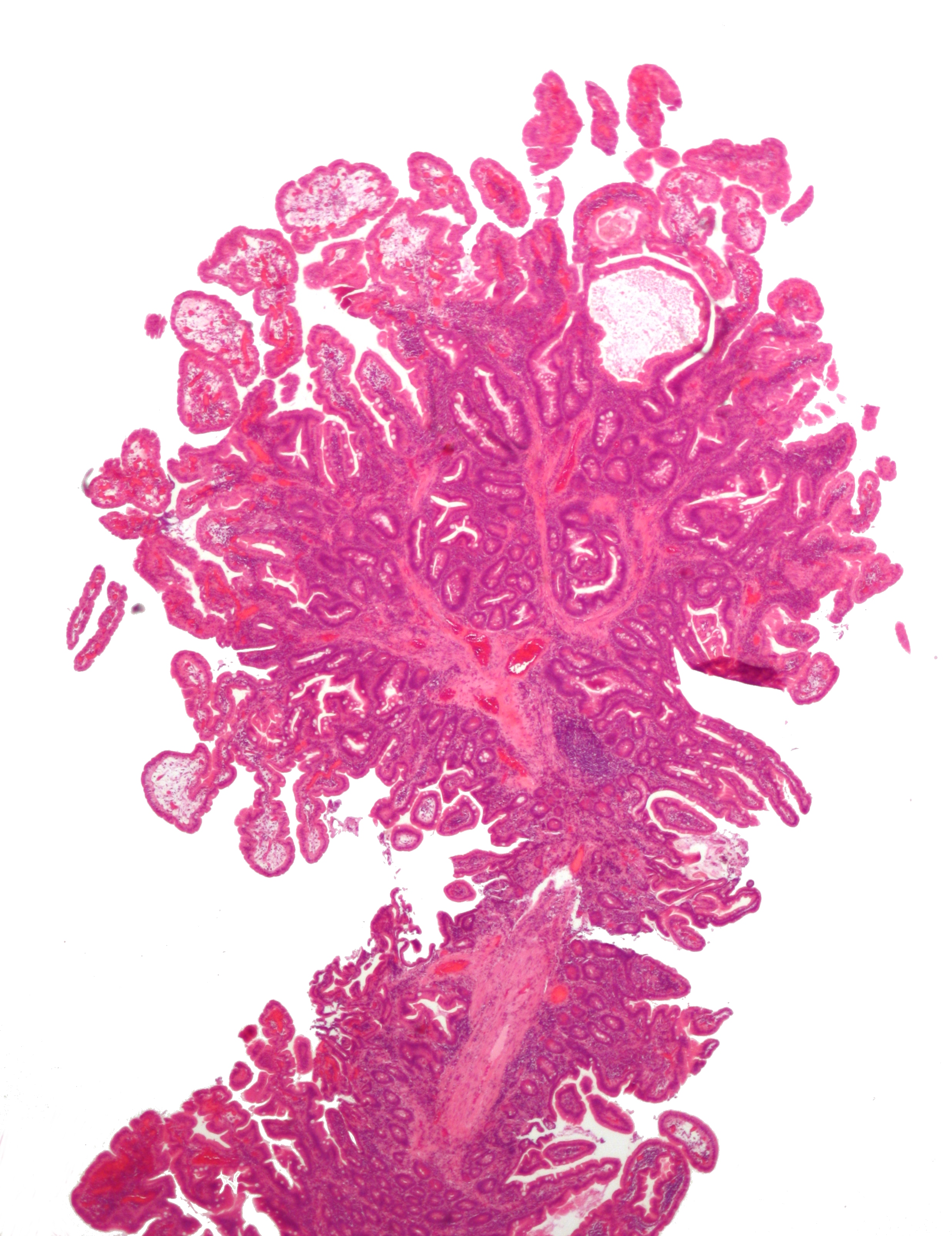
Micrograph of a Peutz–Jeghers colonic polyp – a type of hamartomatous polyp. H&E stain.

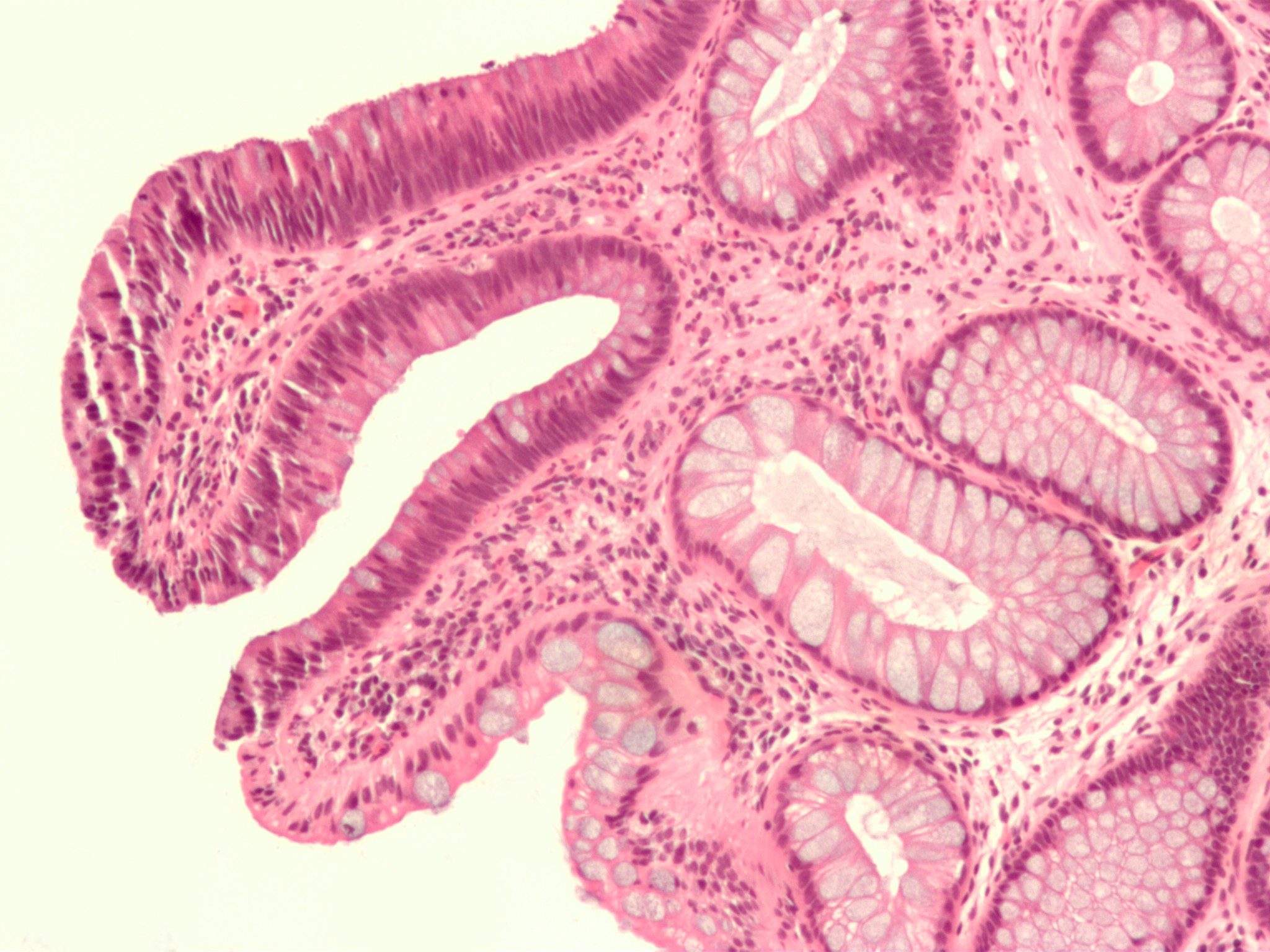
Micrograph of a tubular adenoma – dysplastic epithelium (dark purple) on left of image; normal epithelium (blue) on right. H&E stain.

Micrograph of a villous adenoma. These polyps are considered to have a high risk of malignant transformation. H&E stain.

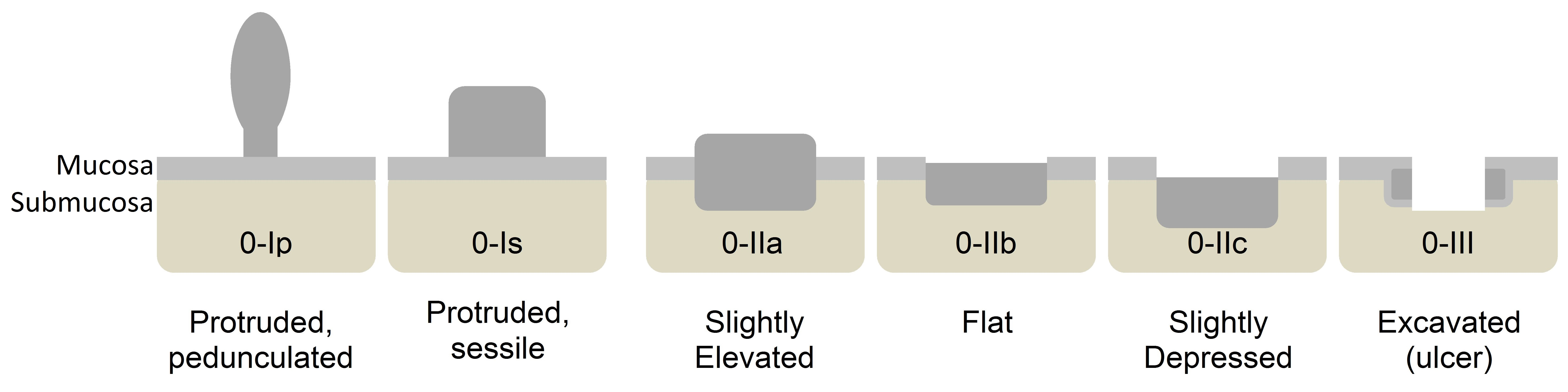
Paris classification of colorectal neoplasms

=== NICE classification ===
In colonoscopy, colorectal polyps can be classified by NICE (Narrow-band imaging International Colorectal Endoscopic):

	Type 1	Type 2	Type 3
Color	Same or lighter than background	Browner than background	Browner or darkly browner than background, sometimes patchy whiter areas
Vessels	None, or isolated lacy vessels coursing across the lesion	Brown vessels surrounding white structures	Area of disrupted or missing vessels
Surface Pattern	Homogenous, or dark or white spots of uniform size	Oval, tubular or branched white structures surrounded by brown vessels	Amorphous or absent surface pattern
Most likely pathology	Hyperplasia	Adenoma	Deep submucosal invasive cancer
Treatment	Follow up	Mucosal or submucosal polypectomy	Surgical operation

== Treatment ==
Polyps can be removed during a colonoscopy or sigmoidoscopy using a wire loop that cuts the stalk of the polyp and cauterises it to prevent bleeding. Many "defiant" polyps—large, flat, and otherwise laterally spreading adenomas—may be removed endoscopically by a technique called endoscopic mucosal resection (EMR), which involves injection of fluid underneath the lesion to lift it and thus facilitate endoscopic resection. Saline water may be used to generate lift, though some injectable solutions such as SIC 8000 may be more effective. Minimally invasive surgery is indicated for polyps that are too large or in unfavorable locations, such as the appendix, that cannot be removed endoscopically. These techniques may be employed as an alternative to the more invasive colectomy.

== Follow-up ==
By United States guidelines, the following follow-up is recommended:

Baseline colonoscopy finding	Recommended time until next colonoscopy
Normal	10 years
1–2 tubular adenomas <10 mm	7–10 years
3–4 tubular adenomas <10 mm	3–5 years
5–10 tubular adenomas <10 mm and/or; Adenoma 10 mm and/or; Adenoma with tubulovillous or villous histology and/or; Adenoma with high-grade dysplasia	3 years
>10 adenomas on single examination	1 year
Piecemeal resection of adenoma 20 mm	6 months
