= Sessile serrated lesion =

- Other names: Sessile serrated polyp (SSP); Sessile serrated adenoma (SSA)
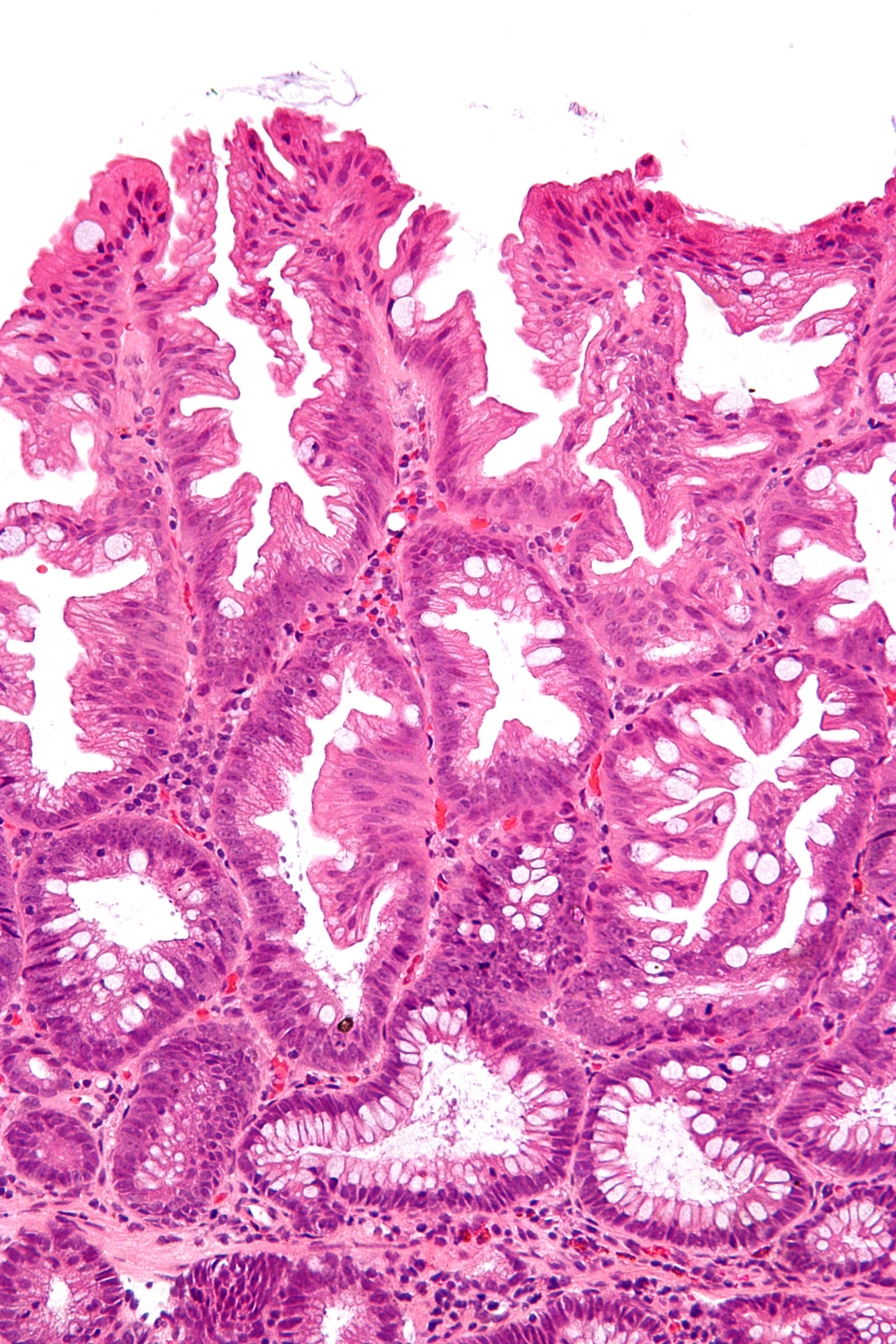
- Micrograph of a sessile serrated lesion. H&E stain.
- Specialty: Gastroenterology
- Symptoms: Asymptomatic
- Complications: Colorectal cancer
- Diagnostic method: Colonoscopy
- Treatment: Polypectomy

A sessile serrated lesion (SSL) is a premalignant flat (or sessile) lesion of the colon, predominantly seen in the cecum and ascending colon.

SSLs are thought to lead to colorectal cancer through the (alternate) serrated pathway. This differs from most colorectal cancer, which arises from mutations starting with inactivation of the APC gene.

Multiple SSLs may be part of the serrated polyposis syndrome.

== Signs and symptoms ==
SSLs are generally asymptomatic. They are typically identified on a colonoscopy and excised for a definitive diagnosis and treatment.

=== Serrated polyposis syndrome ===
The serrated polyposis syndrome (SPS) is a relatively rare condition characterized by multiple and/or large serrated polyps of the colon. Serrated polyps include SSLs, hyperplastic polyps, and traditional serrated adenomas. Diagnosis of this disease is made by the fulfillment of any of the World Health Organization's (WHO) clinical criteria.

== Diagnosis ==
SSLs are diagnosed by their microscopic appearance; histomorphologically, they are characterized by (1) basal dilation of the crypts, (2) basal crypt serration, (3) crypts that run horizontal to the basement membrane (horizontal crypts), and (4) crypt branching. The most common of these features is basal dilation of the crypts.

Unlike conventional colonic adenomas (e.g. tubular adenoma, villous adenoma), they do not (typically) have nuclear changes (nuclear hyperchromatism, nuclear crowding, elliptical/cigar-shaped nuclei).

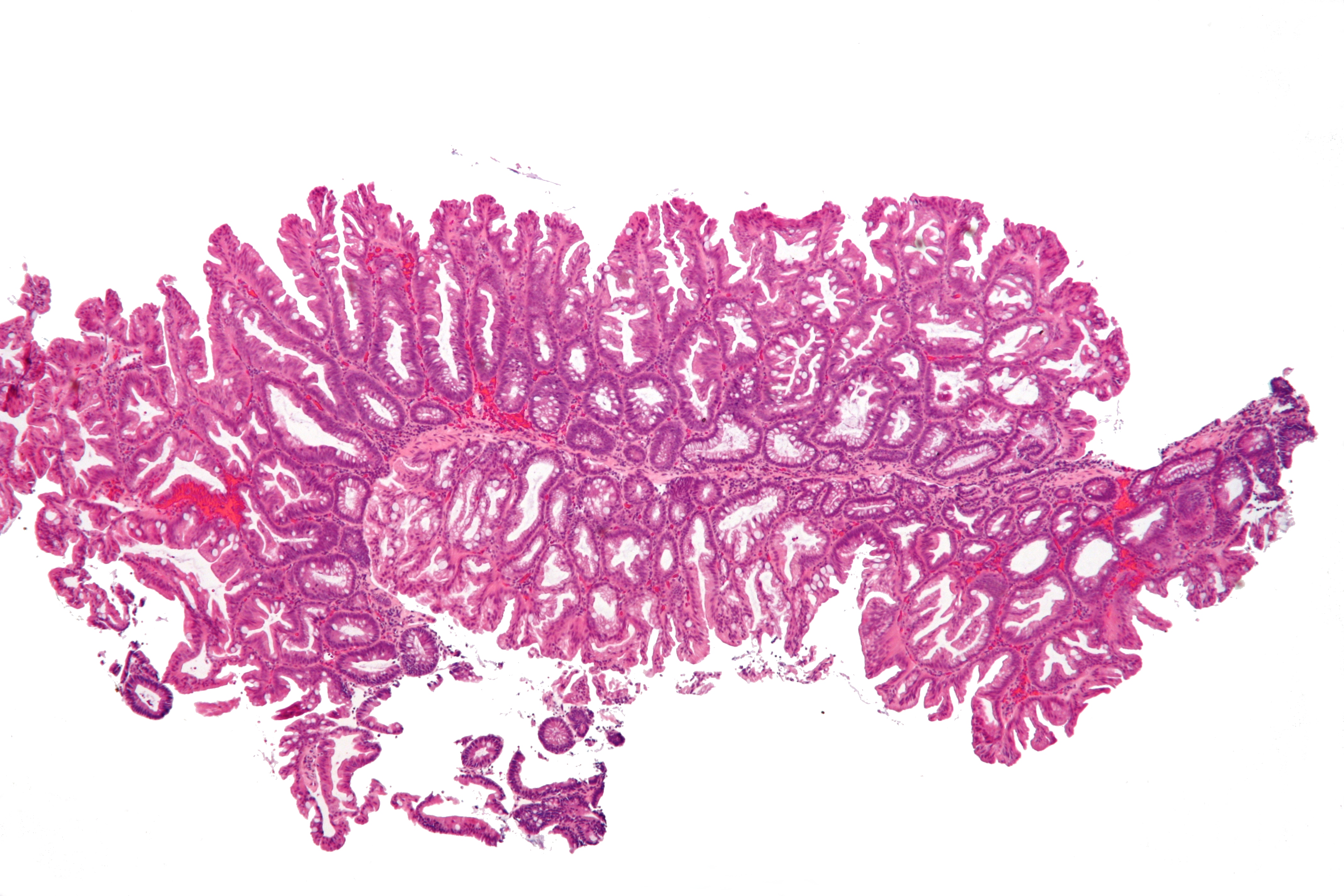
Low magnification micrograph of an SSL.

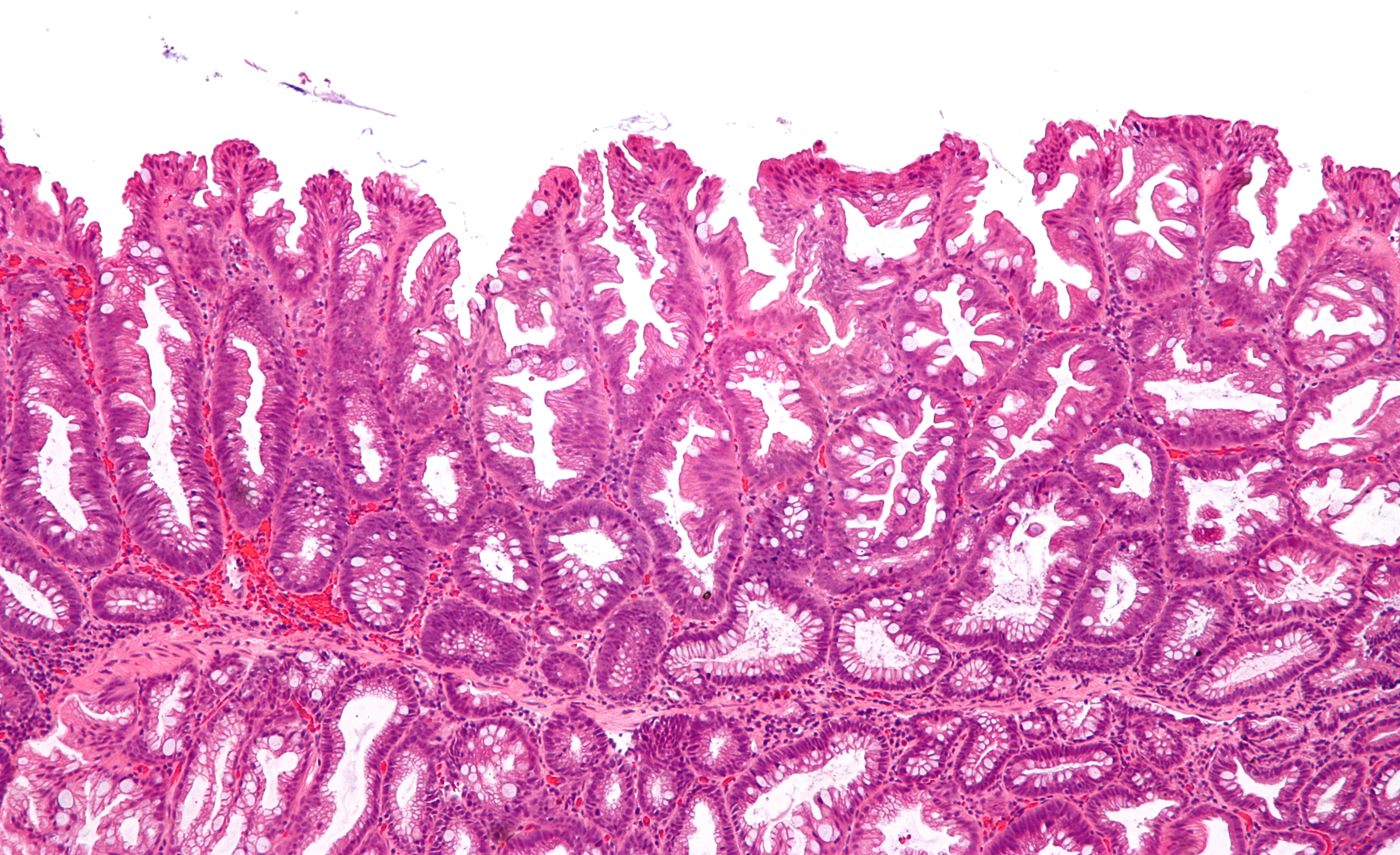
Intermediate magnification micrograph of an SSL.

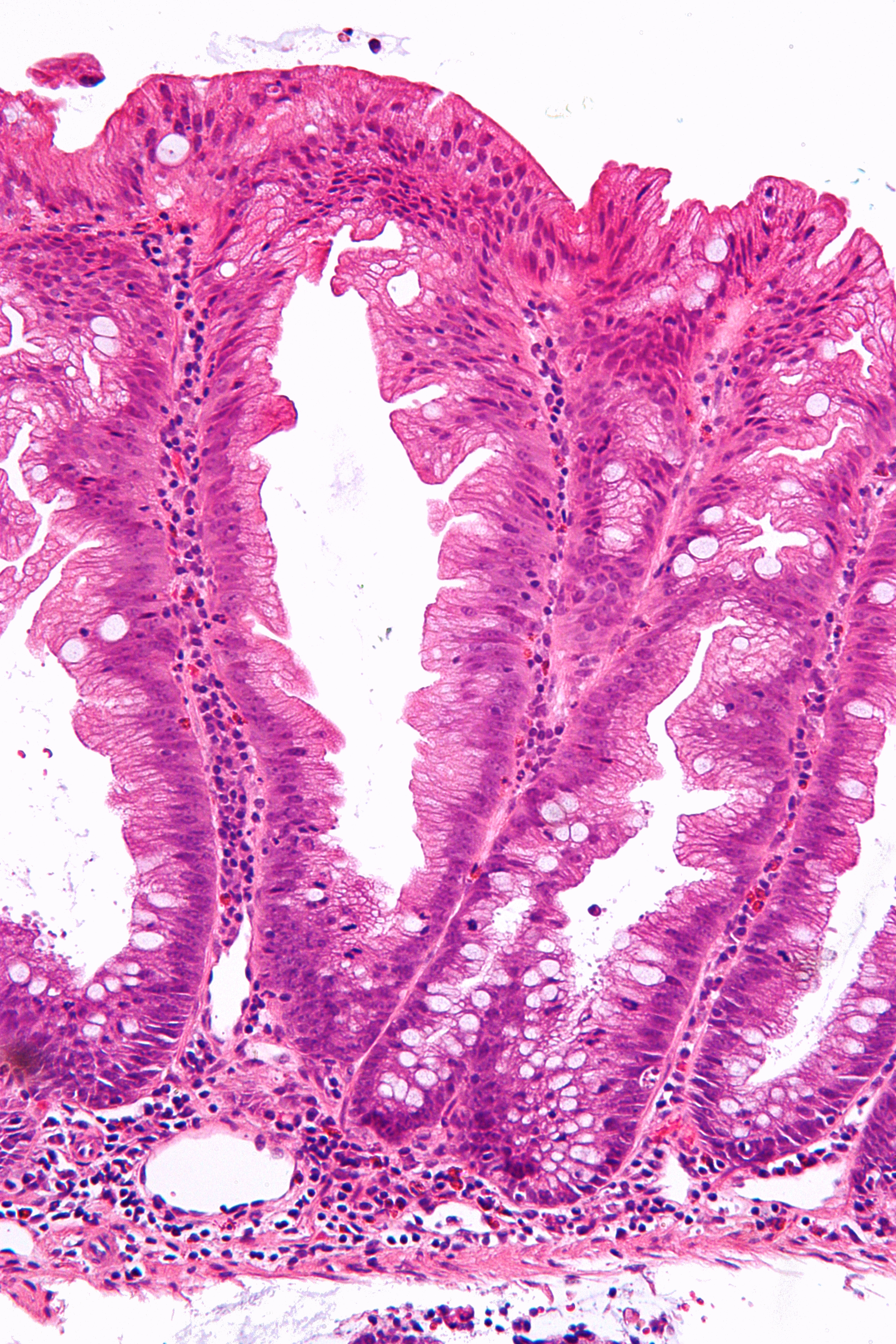
High magnification micrograph of a SSL showing crypt branching.

== Treatment ==
Complete removal of a SSL is considered curative.

Several SSLs confer a higher risk of subsequently finding colorectal cancer and warrant more frequent surveillance. The surveillance guidelines are the same as for other colonic adenomas. The surveillance interval is dependent on (1) the number of adenomas, (2) the size of the adenomas, and (3) the presence of high-grade microscopic features.

== Epidemiology ==
Sessile serrated lesions account for about 25% of all serrated polyps. Advanced SSLs with cytological dysplasia are rare in younger patients, and progression of SSLs appears to be linked with ageing.

== History ==
Sessile serrated adenomas were first described in 1996. In 2019, the World Health Organization recommended the use of the term "sessile serrated lesion," rather than sessile serrated polyp or adenoma.

== See also ==
- Polyp table
- Colonic polyps
- Colorectal polyps
- Colorectal carcinoma
- Microsatellite instability
