= Traditional serrated adenoma =

Traditional serrated adenomas
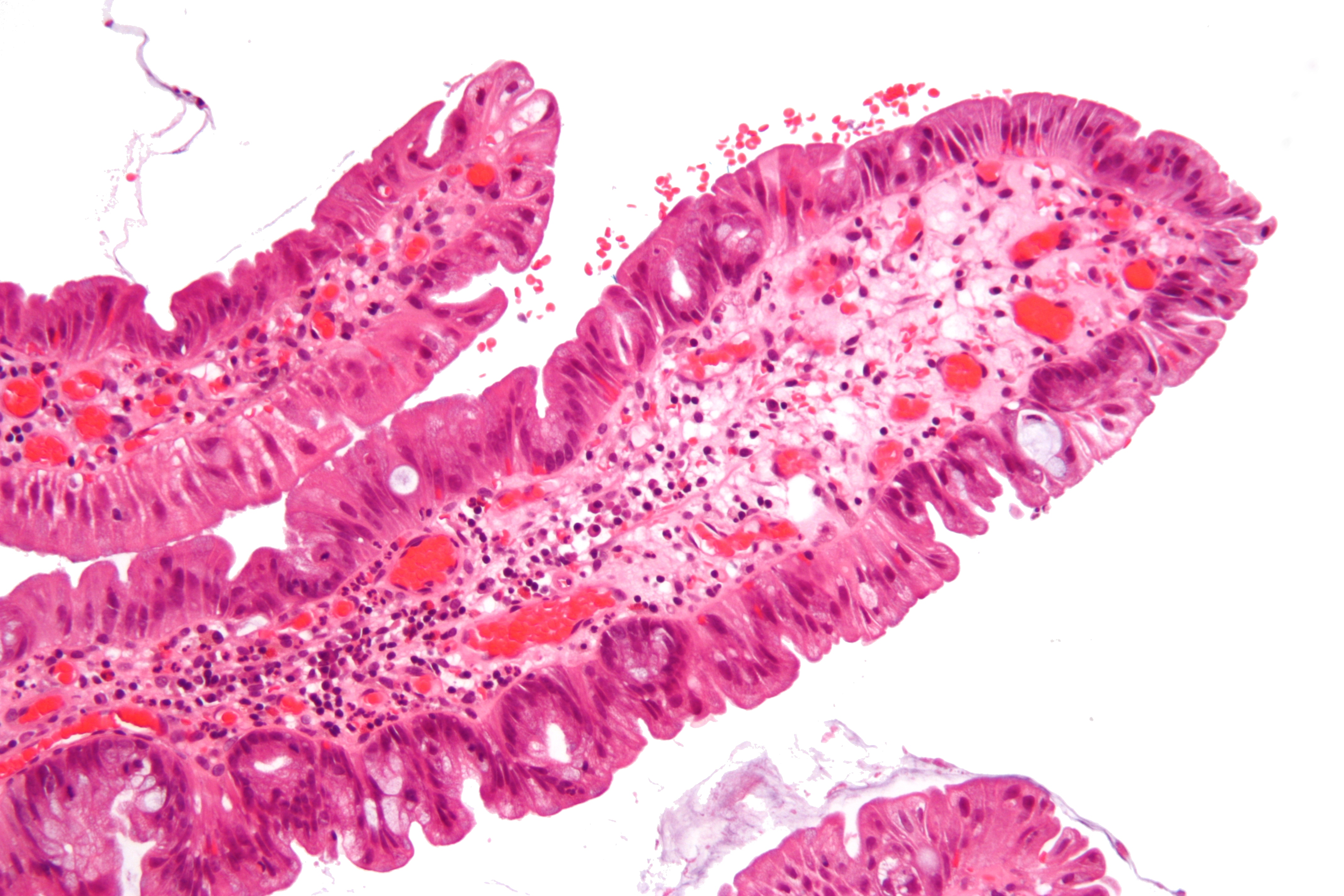
- Traditional serrated adenoma with intermediate magnification, showing serrated crypts and cytologic atypia (H&E stain).
- Specialty: Gastroenterology
- Symptoms: Asymptomatic
- Complications: Colorectal cancer
- Usual onset: >50 years of age
- Diagnostic method: Colonoscopy
- Treatment: Polypectomy
- Frequency: <1% of all colon polyps

Traditional serrated adenoma is a premalignant type of polyp found in the colon, often in the distal colon (sigmoid, rectum). Traditional serrated adenomas are a type of serrated polyp, and may occur sporadically or as a part of serrated polyposis syndrome. Traditional serrated adenomas are relatively rare, accounting for less than 1% of all colon polyps. Usually, traditional serrated adenomas are found in the distal colon and are usually less than 10 mm in size.

== Histopathology ==
Traditional serrated adenomas are characterized by ectopic crypts, pseudostratification, and a villous pattern with stretched nuclei.

== Epidemiology ==
Usually found in individuals over the age of 50 years, traditional serrated adenomas affect men and women equally. The overall prevalence of traditional serrated adenomas is less than 1% of the general population. Traditional serrated adenomas are the least common type of serrated polyps found in the colon, accounting for 5% of serrated colon polyps.
