= Matteo Carandini =

Italian-American neuroscientist

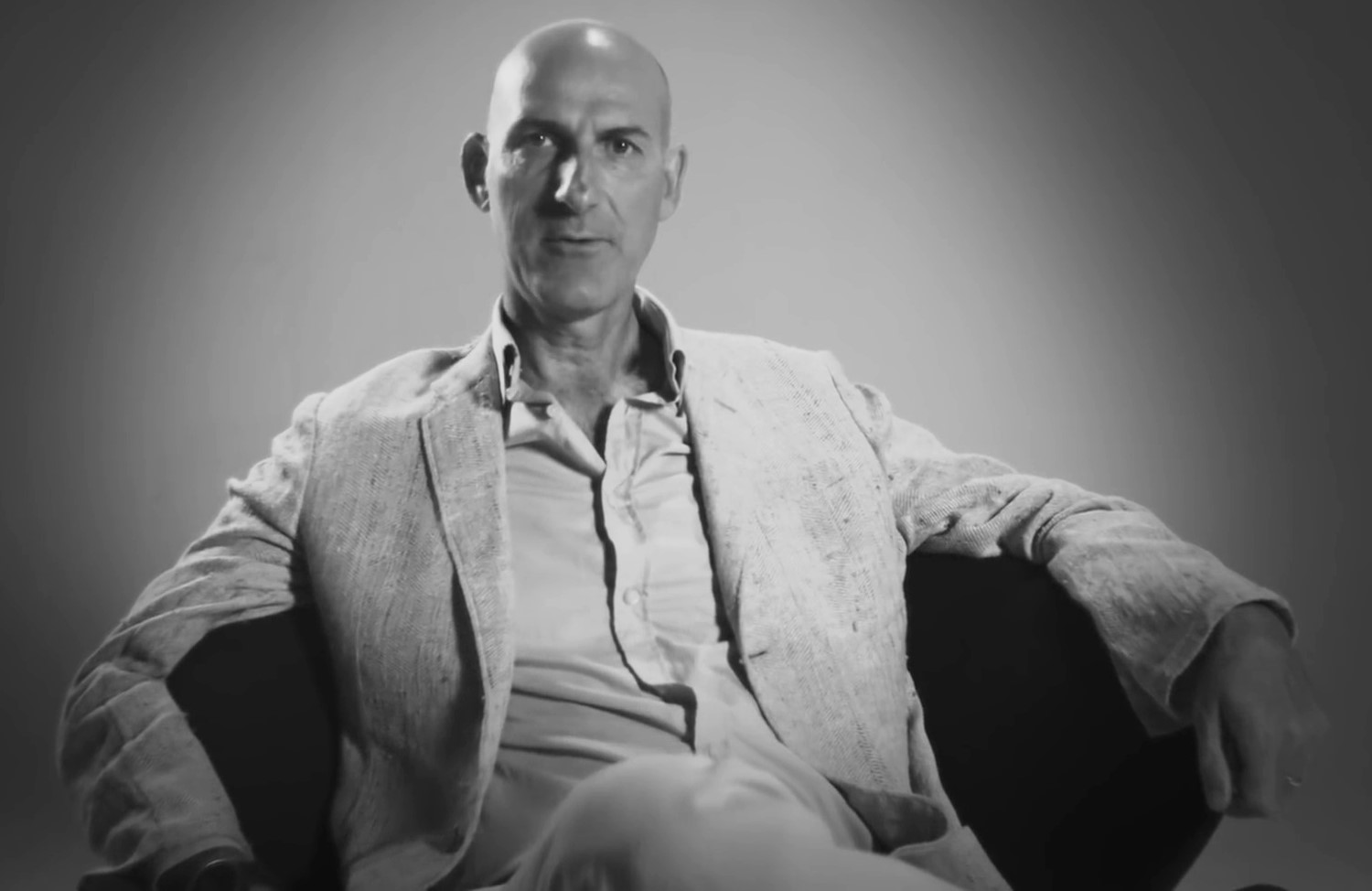
- Carandini speaks to the Wellcome Trust in 2024
- Born: 1967 (age 58–59); Rome, Italy
- Awards: McKnight Scholar 2005, GlaxoSmithKline; Fight for Sight Chair 2007, European Research Council Advanced Investigator 2009, Wellcome Trust Senior Investigator 2011
- Scientific career
- Fields: Neuroscience (Visual Neuroscience, Computational Neuroscience, Systems Neuroscience)
- Workplaces: University College London (professor)

Matteo Carandini (born 1967) is a neuroscientist who studies the visual system. He is currently a professor at University College London, where he co-directs the Cortical Processing Laboratory with Kenneth D Harris.

He studies the visual cortex at the level of individual neurons and populations of neurons, their intercommunication within the visual cortex, with a particular interest in the functions of the eye, thalamus, and the early visual areas of the cerebral cortex. Carandini conducts his research with the goal of contributing to the knowledge of how the brain processes visual information in the human brain and he works primarily with mice.

His grandfather was ambassador Nicolo Carandini, and his uncle is archaeologist Andrea Carandini.

== Achievements ==
In the 1990s, working with David Heeger and J. Anthony Movshon he refined and provided evidence for Heeger's normalization model of V1 responses.

Together with David Ferster he characterized the relationship between synaptic excitation, synaptic inhibition, membrane potential, and firing rate in visual cortex and discovered that prolonged visual stimulation causes a tonic hyperpolarization in V1 neurons. Further work characterized fast adaptive mechanisms in the responses of the early visual system, compared cortical responses to the properties of natural images and tested the resulting models' responses to complex natural stimuli.

More recent work concerns the way that non-visual information affects activity in the classical visual system, including the discovery that neurons in primary visual cortex encode bodily movements and even information about an animal's location in space, a property previously thought to be restricted to higher-order brain systems such as place cells. Carandini has contributed to the development of Neuropixels probes, and is a founding member of the International Brain Laboratory, which uses this technology to study how brain activity subserves sensory discrimination. He is an advocate of Open access publishing in scientific research. He was elected a Fellow of the Royal Society in 2025.
