= Sainsbury Wellcome Centre for Neural Circuits and Behaviour =

English neuroscience research institute

Sainsbury Wellcome Centre
- Established: 2016
- Parent institution: University College London
- Director: Tom Mrsic-Flogel
- Location: London, United Kingdom
- Website: sainsburywellcome.org
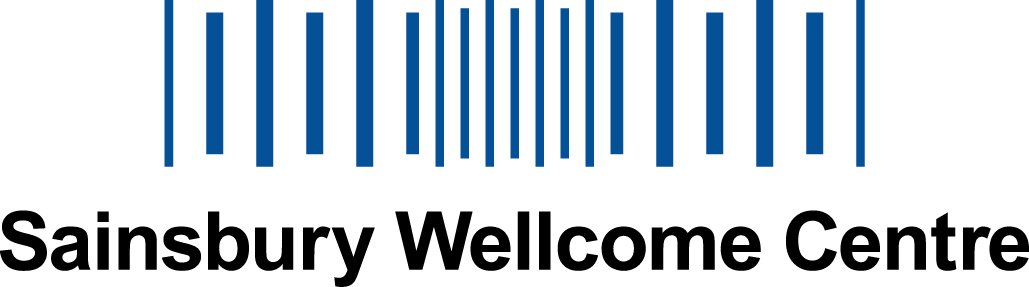

The Sainsbury Wellcome Centre (SWC) is a neuroscience research institute located in London, United Kingdom. The SWC is part of University College London (UCL), but sits outside of the faculty structure. It is funded by the Gatsby Charitable Foundation and Wellcome.

Founded in 2016, the Centre comprises 12 labs whose research feeds into the mission of understanding how the brain generates behaviour. SWC is led by Director Professor Tom Mrsic-Flogel, Associate Director Professor Troy Margrie, Chief Scientific Officer Professor Tom Otis and Centre Manager Emma Bennett.

== History and funding ==
Conceptualised by Lord David Sainsbury in partnership with the Wellcome Trust, SWC was officially opened on 23 May 2016 by Nobel Laureate Professor Eric Kandel. SWC was established by inaugural Director and Nobel Laureate John O'Keefe with funding from the Gatsby Charitable Foundation and Wellcome Trust.

In October 2016, Professor Tom Mrsic-Flogel was appointed as the new Director of the Sainsbury Wellcome Centre.

== Building design ==
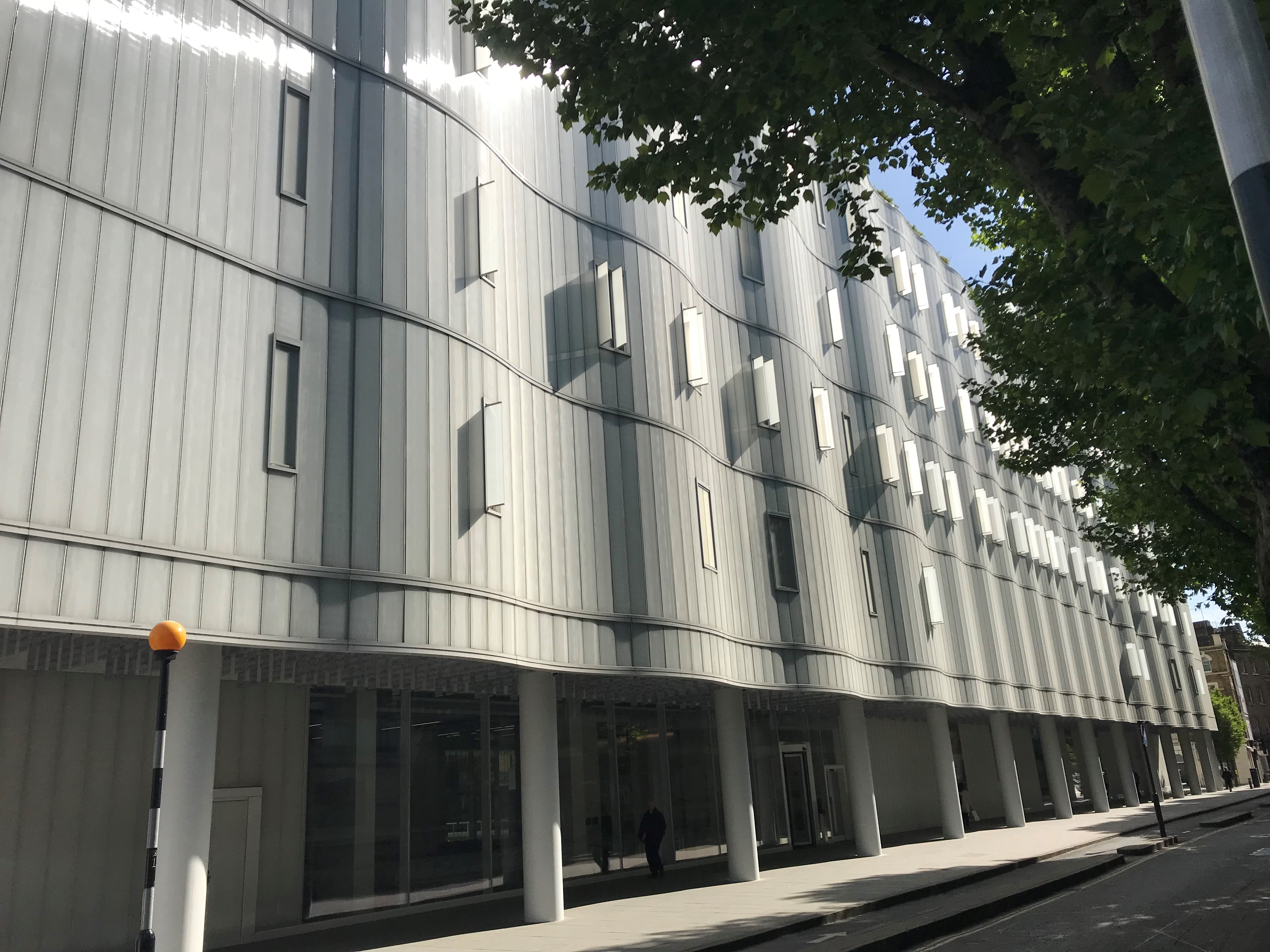
The Sainsbury Wellcome Centre in London

The building was designed by Ian Ritchie of Ian Ritchie Architects. The design of the labs and common areas was based on the feedback and observations from leading neuroscience research institutes around the world. The core of the building houses the Gatsby Computational Neuroscience Unit (GCNU), a computational neuroscience research unit that collaborates closely with SWC.

== Research focus ==
Research at SWC is focused on systems neuroscience. SWC's mission is to understand how neural circuits produce flexible, complex behaviours. The Centre comprises 12 research groups.

Researchers work closely with the Gatsby Computational Neuroscience Unit to bridge theoretical and experimental neuroscience.

== Scientific accomplishments ==
SWC's mission is to understand principles of intelligent behaviours in brains and machines. To deliver this, they work closely with the Gatsby Computational Neuroscience Unit (GCNU).

Prediction errors in sensory processing. The brain can be thought of as a prediction machine that learns from detecting unpredicted events. Hofer and Mrsic-Flogel labs found a neural mechanism for computing sensory prediction errors in the neocortex, relying on cooperative interaction between thalamic and neocortical disinhibitory circuits.

Future representation in frontal cortex. Behrens and colleagues found that frontal cortex neurons simultaneously represent current and future states, enabling efficient planning. This finding provides a unified framework for understanding frontal cortex function, comparable to discoveries of place and grid cells in the hippocampus or simple cells in the visual cortex. They also found that when animals learn sequences, separate groups of prefrontal neurons keep track of specific moments in the future: "where I'll be next" and "where I'll be after that". When these groups are wired together according to the animal's environmental structure, they create a "spacetime attractor": a stable pattern of activity that projects into, and therefore allows planning into, the future.

Working memory dynamics. The Mrsic-Flogel lab found that working memory is embedded in high-dimensional activity across multiple cortical areas and depends on rapid bidirectional communication between them.

Vector-based navigation. Research from O'Keefe, Branco, and Margrie labs found that the hippocampus generates goal-directed vectors, and described the downstream circuits that transform these vectors into egocentric coordinates for navigation, requiring continuous updating by head-direction signals.

A new mechanism for learning. Learning to act is assumed to be driven by dopaminergic reinforcement: positive action-outcomes cause dopamine release, making those actions more likely to be repeated in future (Reward Prediction Error). However, research from the Stephenson-Jones lab published in 2025 found a new, value-free dopaminergic mechanism, the Action Prediction Error (APE). Rather than reinforcing behaviours that have been rewarded, APE drives repetition of previous behaviours regardless of reward. This explains how animals transition from goal-directed to habitual behaviour without the need for complex value comparisons, thereby freeing up cognitive resources.

Economic decision-making. The Erlich and Duan labs identified key brain regions involved in representing and comparing offer values during economic choices.

Fear and anxiety control. The Branco, Hofer and Margrie groups identified specific inhibitory circuits that modulate threat responses based on prior experience.

Statistical learning across species. A collaboration between Akrami and Latham (GCNU) labs compared humans, rats, and mice in statistical learning tasks, and found species-specific differences in learning algorithms. This research provides insights into the neural basis of statistical learning in decision-making.

Learning improves coding of meaningful sensory information. A series of collaborative studies at the interface of theory and experiment across Hofer, Sahani (GCNU), Mrsic-Flogel and Clopath labs found that learning reconfigures cell-type interactions in sensory cortex to generate activity dynamics that improve the coding of relevant sensory information.

New high-channel recording tools. SWC was part of the collaboration to develop Neuropixels probes, along with scientists at HHMI Janelia Research Campus, the Allen Institute for Brain Science and UCL, and engineers at IMEC. These novel recording devices allow neuroscientists to track the electrical activity of hundreds of individual neurons simultaneously across different brain regions.

== Education ==
The Sainsbury Wellcome Centre runs a four-year PhD programme taught by faculty at SWC, the Gatsby Computational Neuroscience Unit, and affiliated institutions including UCL.

== Governing board ==
SWC Governing Board is chaired by Professor Barry Everitt, other voting members are Professor Silvia Arber, Professor Adrienne Fairhall, Peter Hesketh, Matt Kaiser, Professor Zoe Kourtzi, Dr Cheryl Moore, Professor Tony Movshon, Professor Gail Taylor, Dr Rebecca Wilson.
