= Kenneth D Harris =

British neuroscientist

- Awards: Wellcome Trust Senior Investigator 2011, European Research Council Advanced Investigator 2014, Royal Society Wolfson Research Merit Award, EPSRC Leadership Fellowship, Alfred P. Sloan Fellowship
- Scientific career
- Fields: Neuroscience, Computational Neuroscience, Systems Neuroscience
- Workplaces: University College London (professor)

Kenneth D. Harris is a neuroscientist at University College London. He is most known for his contributions to the understanding of the neural code used by vast populations of neurons. Among his discoveries is the finding that populations in sensory areas of the brain also code for body movements. Harris has contributed to the development of silicon probes and most recently of Neuropixels probes. With these probes, he and his team discovered that engagement in a task activates neurons throughout the brain.

Harris obtained his PhD from UCL in the laboratory of Michael Recce, and did his postdoctoral studies at Rutgers University in the laboratory of Gyorgy Buzsaki. He is a Professor of Quantitative Neuroscience at the UCL Queen Square Institute of Neurology, where he co-directs the Cortical Processing Laboratory with Matteo Carandini. Harris is a founding member of the International Brain Laboratory.
