= Alexander Huk =

American neuroscientist

Alexander C. Huk
- Education: Swarthmore College (BA); Stanford University (PhD)
- Awards: Vision Science Society Young Investigator Award ^{(2011)}
- Scientific career
- Fields: Neuroscience (Visual Neuroscience, Computational Neuroscience, Systems Neuroscience)
- Workplaces: UCLA UT-Austin
- Doctoral advisor: David Heeger

Alexander C. Huk is an American neuroscientist. Prior to moving to UCLA in 2022, he was the Raymond Dickson Centennial Professor #2 of Neuroscience and Psychology, and the Director of the Center for Perceptual Systems at The University of Texas at Austin. His laboratory studies how the brain integrates information over space and time and how these neural signals guide behavior in the natural world. He has made contributions towards understanding how the brain represents 3D visual motion and how those representations are used to make perceptual judgments

== Education ==
Huk received a B.A. from Swarthmore College in 1996, and earned his Ph.D. from Stanford University under the supervision of David Heeger. He completed his postdoctoral training at the University of Washington.

== Career ==
In his doctoral work, Huk used fMRI to map the human brain areas associated with visual motion processing. His postdoctoral work investigated the neural mechanisms underlying temporal integration during perceptual decisions. In his own laboratory, Huk and collaborators have used a combination of psychophysics, fMRI, and electrophysiology to establish the neural basis of 3D motion processing. His group has also investigated the neural basis of perceptual decision-making. In 2011, he won the Young Investigator Award from the Vision Sciences Society.
