= Tom Mrsic-Flogel =

Experimental neuroscientist

Tom Mrsic-Flogel FRS
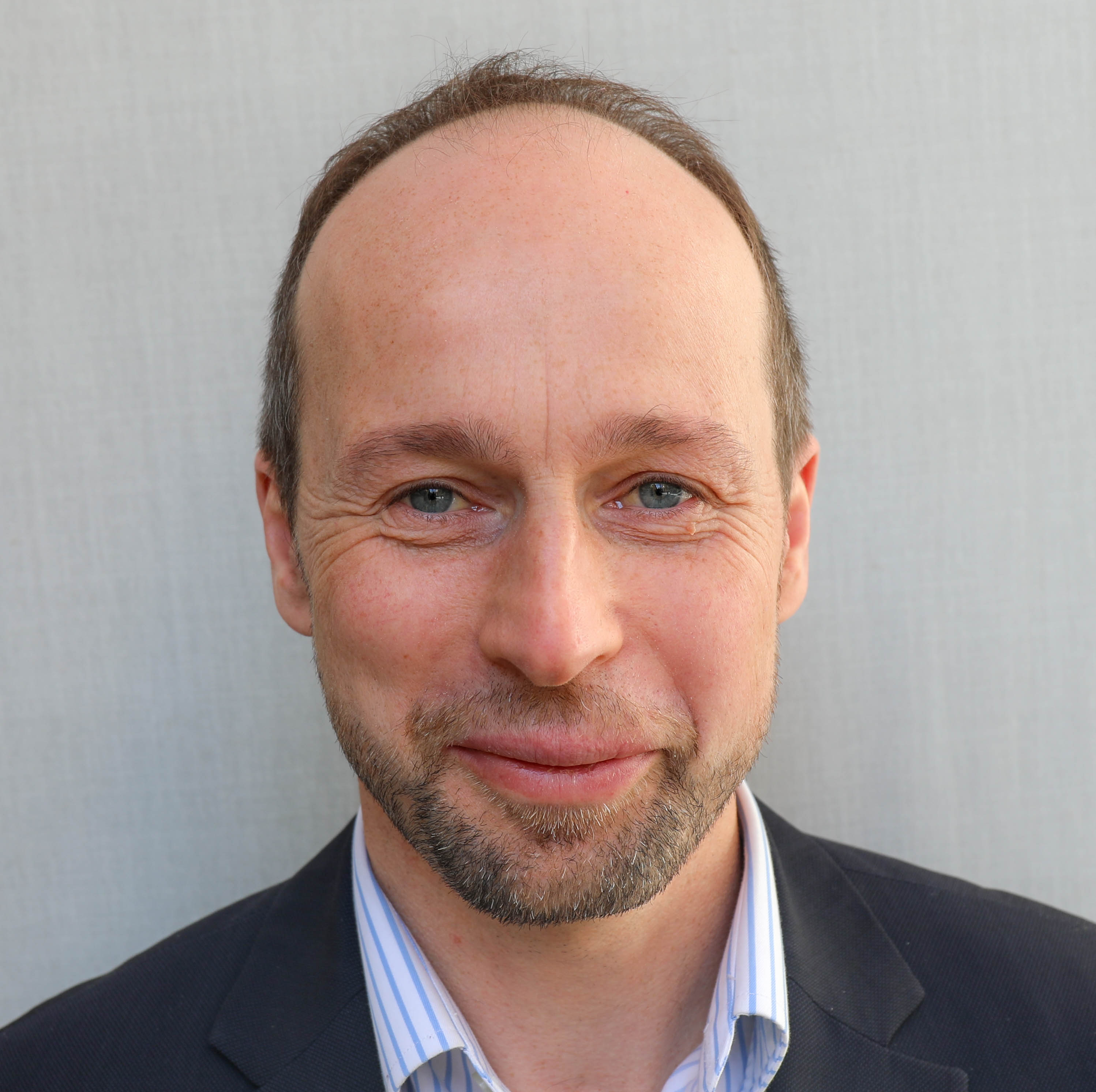
- Education: B.A. Biological Sciences M.Sc. Neuroscience D.Phil. Neuroscience
- Alma mater: Oxford University
- Occupations: Professor of Neuroscience & Director of the Sainsbury Wellcome Centre
- Employer: University College London
- Spouse: Sonja Hofer
- Website: Mrsic-Flogel Lab

Tom Mrsic-Flogel is an experimental neuroscientist. He is Director of the Sainsbury Wellcome Centre and a Professor in Neuroscience at University College London (UCL). Mrsic-Flogel is a founding member of the International Brain Laboratory.

Mrsic-Flogel’s research focuses on establishing mechanistic accounts of brain function, including how brain areas communicate and contribute to perception, cognition and learning. His research has potential implications for psychiatric disorders such as autism and schizophrenia and future applications in brain-computer interfaces (BCIs).

== Education and career ==
Mrsic-Flogel received his undergraduate degree and PhD in 2001 from Oxford University. He completed postdoctoral work with Tobias Bonhoeffer at the Max Planck Institute of Neurobiology (since 2023 named Max Planck Institute for Biological Intelligence) in Munich. In 2007, he became Lecturer and Wellcome Trust Fellow at UCL, after which he was appointed as Professor at the University of Basel.

Since 2016, Mrsic-Flogel has been Director of the Sainsbury Wellcome Centre for Neural Circuits and Behaviour, an independently-funded neuroscience institute (Gatsby Charitable Foundation and Wellcome) opened in 2014 and hosted by UCL.

== Research and work ==
Mrsic-Flogel is known for detailing the wiring principles of the brain’s networks and how these relate to their function. His work has used new approaches to measure individual synaptic connections between brain cells of known function, and molecular anatomy tools, to show the extent of influence of individual neurons on the rest of the brain.

Through his research in the visual cortex, Mrsic-Flogel discovered that synaptic connections are not organized randomly but are structured according to several specific wiring principles:

- Neurons preferentially connect if they are tuned to the same feature of visual stimuli and only if they project to the same target structure.
- Strong and reciprocal connections are found solely between neurons with the most correlated activity, while only weak connections link neurons that are uncorrelated.
- The more connections a neuron receives from its neighbours, the closer it tracks their activity.

Mrsic-Flogel has demonstrated how the wiring of neural circuits is adjusted through experience and learning. His work has shown how circuits are optimally tuned to the statistical regularities of the natural world and how learning can further refine neural circuits in the adult brain.

Mrsic-Flogel’s current lab studies how the brain makes decisions by combining sensory information with previously learned knowledge. Research from the Mrsic-Flogel lab has revealed how visual working memory in mice is maintained across interconnected brain regions.

Scientists in the Mrsic-Flogel lab have shed light on how the brain represents causally-controlled objects. More recently, the Mrsic-Flogel lab investigated how individual neurons in mice are influenced by two different cognitive and behavioural states – attention and running – that were once thought to share a common mechanism. They found that spatial attention and running influence neurons independently with different dynamics.

== Awards and honors ==
- Fellow of the Royal Society 2026
- Larry Katz Prize for Innovative Research in Neuroscience 2015
- Wellcome Senior Research Fellow 2011
- Wellcome Research Career Development Fellow 2007
- Alexander von Humboldt Research Fellowship 2003–04

== Memberships ==
- Member of the Board at the Lundbeck Foundation (elected in 2026)
- Chair of the Programme Committee (2016–2018) and a member of the Executive Committee for the Federation of European Neuroscience Societies (FENS)
- Founding member of the International Brain Laboratory
- Directorial Search Committee member, Netherlands Institute for Neuroscience
- Chair of the Scientific Advisory Council for the Allen Institute’s new Institute for Neural Dynamics
- Faculty of Life Sciences Executive Committee, University College London
- Founding Member, ALBA Network, promoting equality and diversity in Brain Sciences in Europe
- Co-founder of the European Network of Visual Neuroscientists ‘EuroVision’
