= Huk =

Huk or HUK may refer to:

== People ==
- Alexander Huk, American neuroscientist
- Ihor Huk (footballer) (born 2002), Ukrainian footballer
- Ihor Huk (surgeon) (DOB unknown), Ukrainian surgeon
- Tomáš Huk (born 1994), Slovak footballer
- Agnieszka Kłopotek (née Huk; born 1969), Polish politician
- HuK, former professional Starcraft II player Chris Loranger (born 1989)

== Places ==
- Huk Formation, a geologic formation in Norway
- Huk, Isfahan, a village in Iran
- Huk, Norway, a beach in Bygdøy, Oslo
- Huk, South Khorasan, a village in Iran
- Zhenetskyi Huk, a waterfall in Ukraine

== Arts and entertainment ==
- Huk!, a 1956 film set in the Philippines
- "Huk", a 2015 single by the South Korean girl group Unicorn

== Other uses ==
- Huk, short for Hukbalahap, a Communist guerrilla movement in the Philippines, or a member of the movement
- HUK, IATA airport code for Hukuntsi Airport, Botswana
- huk, ISO 539-3 code for the Hulung language, an extinct language of Indonesia
- HUK HH-43 Huskie, a United States Navy helicopter
- Hunter-killer Group, a type of anti-submarine formation during World War II
