= Jonathan Pillow =

American neuroscientist

Jonathan Pillow is an American neuroscientist and professor at the Princeton Neuroscience Institute. His research focuses on the intersection of neuroscience, statistics, and machine learning.

== Early life and education ==
Pillow grew up in Phoenix, Arizona. He attended the University of Arizona as a Flinn Scholar, where he majored in mathematics and philosophy. After a year as a Fulbright U.S. Student Fellow in Morocco studying North African literature, he attended graduate school at New York University's Center for Neural Science. He received a Ph.D. in neuroscience in 2005 for research on statistical models of information processing in the early visual pathway.

== Career ==
After his Ph.D., Pillow was a postdoctoral fellow at the Gatsby Computational Neuroscience Unit at University College London. From 2009 to 2014, he was an assistant professor at the University of Texas at Austin in the departments of Psychology, Neuroscience, and Statistics & Data Science. He is currently a professor in the Princeton Neuroscience Institute and the Department of Psychology.

Pillow’s lab at Princeton develops statistical methods for understanding how large populations of neurons transmit and process information. His research interests include sensory-motor decision making, working memory, and latent variable models.

Since 2016, Pillow has been a member of the International Brain Laboratory.

== Awards and honors ==
In 2012, Pillow received the Presidential Early Career Award for Scientists and Engineers, the highest honor bestowed by the U.S. government on science and engineering professionals in the early stages of their independent research careers.
