= David Brainard =

David Brainard may refer to:

- David H. Brainard (born 1960), American psychologist and vision researcher
- David L. Brainard (1856–1946), American arctic explorer and Army officer

== See also ==
- David Brainerd (1718–1747) – Missionary in colonial North America
