= International Brain Laboratory =

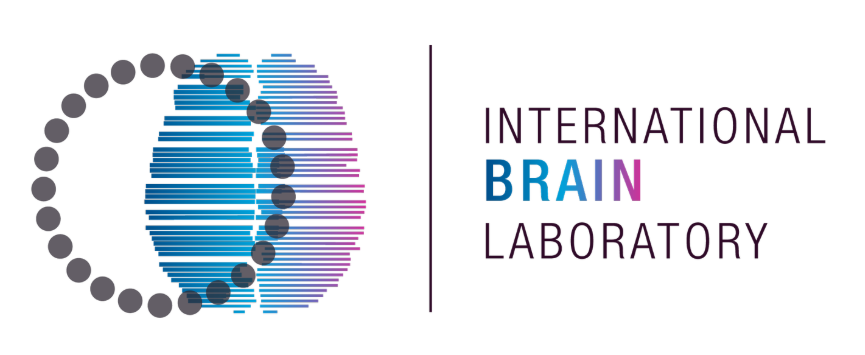
Logo of the International Brain Laboratory

The International Brain Laboratory (IBL) is a large-scale, international collaboration of neuroscience laboratories that aims to understand decision making at the neuronal level. In 2025, the IBL published its milestone results, detailing the first-ever complete brain-wide activity map of decision-making. The collaboration brings together over 80 scientists in 19 labs across the US and Europe to understand a single behavior in the mouse brain by pooling data and using standardized methods. It is funded by the Simons Foundation and Wellcome Trust and was inspired by the success of other large-scale collaborations in science, such as CERN.

== Brainwide map ==
In September 2025, the IBL published its first major findings in two papers in two coordinated papers in Nature. The research provided the first comprehensive, brain-wide map of neural activity during a decision-making task in mice, recorded at the level of single neurons

A key finding that challenged traditional views of brain function was that the decision-making process was not localized to a few areas, but was distributed across almost the entire brain. Signals related to the task—from visual processing to the motor action and the resulting reward—were found in nearly all 279 brain areas recorded.One of the founding members described the activity as lighting up the brain "like a Christmas tree."

The immense scale of the project involved recording from over 621,000 neurons across 139 mice in 12 labs. The companion paper detailed how the brain encodes prior expectations, finding this information was also encoded across 20% to 30% of brain regions, spanning from early sensory to high-level cortical areas.

== Approach ==
The IBL's research model relies on standardizing all experimental and data processing methods across its participating labs to ensure data reproducibility. To achieve its goal of a brain-wide map, researchers trained mice on a single, standardized visual discrimination task. In the task, mice see a stimulus on the left or right side of a screen and must move a wheel to bring it to the center to receive a reward.

While the mice perform the task, researchers use high-density silicon probes (Neuropixels) to record the activity of thousands of neurons across many brain regions simultaneously. By pooling the recordings from different labs, each targeting different brain areas, the IBL was able to construct a complete map covering 95% of the mouse brain's volume. The resulting dataset has been made publicly available to the wider neuroscience community.

== Origins ==
IBL was founded in 2016 by Zachary Mainen (Champalimaud Center for the Unknown), Michael Hausser (University College London), and Alexandre Pouget (University of Geneva). These scientists argued in a paper published the same year that, given the complexity of the questions in neuroscience and the scale of the technical challenge, it seems unlikely that the research performed by individual labs will be sufficient to understand how the brain works. Inspired by the remarkable success of large scale collaborations in physics such as CERN or LIGO, they proposed creating similar focused collaborations in neuroscience based on several core principles:

1. A shared ambitious, yet realistic, goal (e.g. a brain-wide model of decision making in a single species),
2. Tight coordination between theorists and experimentalists.
3. Standardization of the behavioral tasks, hardware and data analysis to ensure reproducibility and allowing pooling of data,
4. Open access to data and resources within and outside the collaboration, and
5. A relatively flat hierarchy and a collaborative decision-making process.

These principles are at the heart of the IBL collaboration.

IBL was officially launched in September 2017 thanks to a $10 million grant from Simons Foundation and a £10 million grant from Wellcome Trust.

The first major scientific milestones for the project were the development of an open source data architecture for large scale neuroscience collaboration and the replication of the behavior across all experimental labs. In 2019, the IBL released the behavioral data, containing close to 3 million mouse choices.

The subsequent milestone involved the assembly of a brain-wide map of activity. This map of activity was obtained with Neuropixels probes, which allow recording up to 300-1000 neurons simultaneously. The results were published in September 2025 in two papers in Nature, detailing the first-ever complete brain-wide activity map of decision-making.

Other recording technologies, such as calcium imaging, will be used in the second phase. These data will then be analyzed and integrated to produce the brain-wide model of decision making.

== Membership ==
Mainen, Hausser and Pouget were joined in 2016 by

- Larry Abbott (Columbia University)
- Dora Angelaki (New York University)
- Matteo Carandini (University College London)
- Anne Churchland (University of California Los Angeles)
- Yang Dan (University of California Berkeley)
- Peter Dayan (Max Planck Institute Tuebingen)
- Sophie Deneve (Ecole Normale Superieure)
- Ila Fiete (Massachusetts Institute of Technology)
- Surya Ganguli (Stanford University)
- Kenneth Harris (University College London)
- Peter Latham (University College London)
- Sonja Hofer (University College London)
- Tom Mrsic-Flogel (University College London)
- Liam Paninski (Columbia University)
- Jonathan Pillow (Princeton University)
- Ilana Witten (Princeton University)
- Tony Zador (Cold Spring Harbor Laboratory)

And in subsequent years by

- Nick Steinmetz (University of Washington) in 2019,
- Tatiana Engel (Cold Spring Harbor Laboratory) in 2020.

David Tank and Carlos Brody (both at Princeton University) joined in 2016 but withdrew in 2017 to avoid conflicts of interest.
