= Peter Schiller (neuroscientist) =

German-born neuroscientist (born 1931)

Peter H. Schiller
- Born: Peter H. Schiller; 5 May 1931; Berlin, Germany
- Died: 23 December 2023 (aged 92)
- Education: Duke University (BA); Clark University (MA, PhD)
- Occupation: Neurophysiologist

Peter H. Schiller (May 5, 1931 — December 23, 2023) was a German-born neuroscientist. At the time of his death, he was a professor emeritus of Neuroscience in the Department of Brain and Cognitive Sciences at the Massachusetts Institute of Technology (MIT). Schiller is well known for his work on the behavioral, neurophysiological and pharmacological studies of the primate visual and oculomotor systems.

== Life and career ==
Schiller was born in 1931 in Berlin, Germany (his father was the Gestalt psychologist Paul von Schiller). His family moved to Budapest in 1934, where he learned Hungarian and attended grammar and secondary schools. After his father moved to the United States to escape the political climate, Schiller then moved to the United States in 1948, to join his father at the Yerkes Laboratory in Jacksonville, Florida headed by Karl Lashley. After his father’s death in 1949, Schiller was moved to Charleston, South Carolina where he worked with Jim Anliker in the Anatomy Department at the Charleston Medical School until 1951. During this time, he met David Rapaport, a psychoanalyst at the Austen Riggs Center in Stockbridge, Massachusetts.

Schiller attended Duke University (1951-1955) where he met his wife and then fulfilled his two-year U.S. military service (in Germany, 1955-1957). He enrolled in a graduate program at Clark University (1959), where he earned his PhD with a thesis on visual masking and metacontrast, before accepting an invitation by Hans-Lukas Teuber to work at the MIT Department of Psychology (1962) for his post-doctoral research. He stayed in the newly formed department and became Assistant Professor in 1964 and full professor in 1971. In 1986, he was appointed Dorothy Poitras Chair for Medical Physiology and retired in 2013.

For more than 40 years, Schiller was a member of the MIT faculty. He trained more than 50 doctoral students and postdoctoral fellows, among them Larry Squire, Michael Stryker, Max Cynader, John H. R. Maunsell, Anya Hurlbert, and Nikos Logothetis.

== Honors ==
- Member of the National Academy of Sciences
- Member of the American Academy of Arts and Sciences
- Honorary member of the Hungarian Academy of Sciences
- Pepose Vision Science Award

== Professional services ==
- NIH Experimental Psychology Study Section, 1973-1977
- NIH Visual Sciences B Study Section, 1982-1986
- Editorial Board, Journal of Neurophysiology, 1983-1989
- Editorial Board, Vision Research, 1987-1990
- Editorial Board, Visual Neuroscience, 1992-1997
- Organizer of numerous symposia including those for IBRO, Society for Neuroscience (SFN), ARVO, WBC, Vision Sciences Society (VSS)

== Grants ==
Continuous funding from

- National Institutes of Health
- National Science Foundation
- Office of Naval Research

== Research ==
=== Studies in eye movement control ===
By recording from the oculomotor neurons in the superior colliculi and frontal eye fields of the alert rhesus monkey as well as performing lesion and electrical stimulation experiments on these areas, Schiller identified and characterized two parallel neural pathways involved in the generation of visually-guided saccadic eye movements. The superior colliculus, which is subcortical, receives visual input from the retina and visual cortex in its upper layers and contains neurons in its lower layers that command saccadic eye movements to the location of visual targets; the cortical frontal eye fields, which have direct and independent access to the eye-movement controllers in the brain stem, help select targets in the visual scene to which the eyes must be directed. The major result that emerged from this work is that the superior colliculus is involved in bringing the center of gaze to the new target (foveation) by utilizing a vector code specifying the error between the present and intended eye positions, a coding scheme that was later shown to be prevalent throughout the neocortex, including the frontal eye fields. Using ablation experiments, Schiller further showed that a lesion of the superior colliculus eliminates express saccades, those occurring at latencies of less than 100 ms. It is believed that the posterior channel, the visual cortex via the superior colliculus, mediates express saccades, while the anterior channel that includes the frontal eye fields is important for target selection.

=== Studies in vision and visual perception ===
In a series of now classic studies Schiller characterized the functions of two sets of parallel pathways in the visual system: The On- and Off- pathways and the midget and parasol pathways. By administering 2-amino-4-phosphono-butyrate (APB) to the eye, he was able to inactivate the ON-retinal pathway reversibly and demonstrate that the On- and Off-pathways remain segregated from the retina to the striate cortex. Behavioral studies established that following blockage of the On-pathway, animals no longer responded to light increments. The central idea that has emerged from this work is that there exist specific neural circuitries for perceiving brightness and darkness, an idea first proposed by Ewald Hering in the 19th Century and thereafter by Richard Jung.

Schiller further found that the midget channel (or parvocellular system) plays a central role in the wavelength and spatial domains: color vision, high spatial frequency form, shape, texture perception, and fine stereopsis. In comparison, the parasol channel (or magnocellular system) plays an important role in the temporal domain: low contrast, high velocity motion, motion parallax, and flicker perception. The lesion studies of Schiller established that this functional segregation tends to be diminished once signals reach the neocortex, although the middle temporal area of neocortex is still dedicated to motion processing.

=== Feature detectors vs multi-function analyzers ===
In a position paper “On the specificity of neurons and visual areas” Schiller (1996) proposed that individual neurons in the primate visual cortex in addition to being feature detectors for color, form, motion, depth, texture, and shape perception are multifunctional, performing complex visual tasks such as view-independent object recognition, visual learning, spatial generalization, visual attention, and stimulus selection. With Karl Zipser and Victor Lamme, he found that stimulus context that falls far outside of the classical receptive field can modulate the response to the center. These findings have been verified in other mammals in addition to primates.

=== A cortical prosthesis to help blind people "see" ===
The work of Schiller has spawned renewed interest in the development of visuo-cortical prostheses for the blind. While doing electrical-stimulation experiments with Edward Tehovnik in 2001, Schiller observed that if he delivered electrical pulses to the visual cortex while an animal was planning an eye movement into the visual receptive field of the cells under study he could bias saccade execution and even evoke saccadic eye movements into the visual receptive field using currents of less than 50 μA. Using such low currents in combination with visual psychophysics, he was able to estimate the size, contrast, and color of phosphenes evoked from the visual cortex of monkeys. This line of work is now being used to assess visual prosthetic devices, which could eventually lead to a functional visual prosthesis for blind people.

== Textbook ==
In 2015, Peter Schiller along with his coauthor, Edward Tehovnik, published a textbook (Vision and the Visual System) that summarized his work within the context of major discoveries on the primate visual system between 1970 and 2015. This book provides a detailed account of the knowledge required of any modern-day visual neuroscientists, young or old.

== Personal life ==
Schiller was married to Ann Howell (deceased). They had three children: David, Kyle, and Sarah. Schiller's hobbies were sailing, playing tennis, skiing, sculpting, and artwork. He lived in Newton, MA until his death.
