= Luc Van den hove =

Belgian electrical engineer and corporate CEO

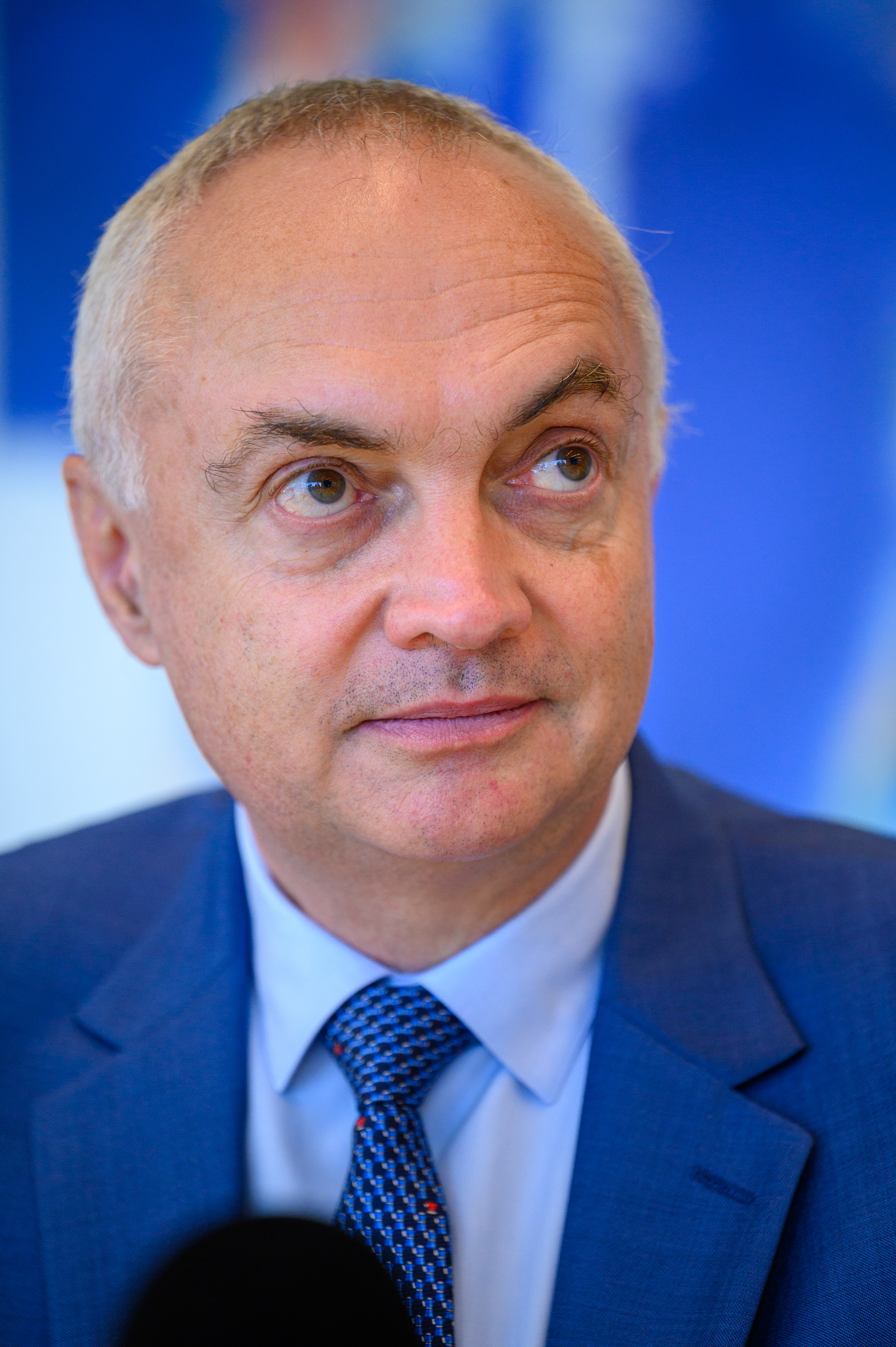
Van den hove in 2021

Luc Van den hove (1 March 1960, Turnhout) is president and chief executive officer (CEO) of IMEC, Europe's largest independent research center in the field of nanoelectronics and digital technologies.

Van den hove is regarded as an expert on technology trends and nano electronics. He holds a PhD in electrical engineering, has authored or co-authored more than 200 publications and conference contributions, is a part-time professor at KU Leuven's Faculty of Engineering Science, and sits on the board of directors at telecommunications company, Proximus.

== Career ==
Van den hove received his PhD in electrical engineering from KU Leuven in Belgium. At the age of 24, Van den hove joined IMEC in its founding year in 1984 and worked as a researcher in silicide and interconnected technologies. He would later go on to become IMEC's Executive Vice President, Chief Operating Officer, and ultimately chief executive officer.

Under Van den hove's first ten years of tenure, IMEC increased its turnover from 275 million to almost 600 million euro. IMEC currently employs over 4000 employees and has research facilities in Belgium, the Netherlands, the United States and Taiwan and offices in Japan, Taiwan, China and India. It has the largest industry eco-system for semiconductor R&D. IMEC works with over 600 partners, including NASA, DARPA, Samsung and Intel.

Van den hove was awarded the 2023 IEEE Robert N. Noyce Medal.

== IMEC & iMinds ==
In 2016, Van den hove led the merger between IMEC and digital research center iMinds, combining IMEC's chip-technology based background and iMinds' artificial intelligence and security knowledge. By integrating iMinds into IMEC, the research center could focus on developing disruptive technologies and solutions for the health, smart cities and mobility, logistics and manufacturing, energy, education and infotainment sectors. More specifically, Van den hove claimed that by combining iMinds' expertise in software, A.I. and ACT with the miniaturisation power of chip technology, IMEC could serve more industrial markets.

After the merger, Van den hove reorganised and expanded IMEC's activity into domains where researchers typically do not have processor expertise, such as cancer research, neuroscience, precision medicine research, genome sequencing, healthcare, agriculture, education, logistics and manufacturing smart cities. Under Van den hove's tenure, IMEC has also started working on quantum computing and artificial intelligence.

IMEC currently performs research on different application fields of nanoelectronics, software and ICT, applications related to the Internet of Things (IOT), and cleaner energy. More specifically, this includes wearable health monitoring (e.g. EEG electrodes, ingestible sensors), life sciences (smart implantable devices, neural probes, lab-on-chip, organ-on-chip), wireless communication (e.g. 5G and wireless IoT communication), image sensors, and vision systems (e.g. CMOS and photonics-based image sensors), large-area flexible electronics (e.g. smart textiles), solar cells, and GaN power electronics.

== Partnerships and ventures ==
Van den hove has initiated several research partnerships with IMEC. As of 2019, IMEC has attracted 65 million euro in funding from The Netherlands to create a research venture to develop technologies focused on making farming and food manufacturing sustainable. In 2018, Van den hove also declared he was working on the creation of a quantum computing, artificial intelligence, and supercomputing hub.

At the end of May 2015, IMEC and Johns Hopkins University announced the launch of a joint venture, miDiagnostics, which aimed at developing medical chips and diagnostic devices that will assist doctors and patients in getting quick diagnoses. In 2019, IMEC announced it had developed a chip that can determine if someone has cancer with one blood test. IMEC reported that the technology was both much faster than traditional blood tests and more accurate. A few months later NASA awarded funding to test a technology for monitoring astronauts’ health status under zero gravity conditions, in order to advance space health diagnostics.

He is interested in combining biomedical sciences with artificial intelligence and nanotechnology to advance neuroscience and a general understanding of neurodegenerative diseases. In 2017, IMEC designed and fabricated the world's first miniature neural probe for simultaneous recording of multiple brain regions at neuronal resolution. The results were published in Nature. In 2019, The New York Times reported IMEC's Neuropixels technology is widely recognised as the most advanced method of gathering data from brain cells. In December 2018, IMEC announced the creation of a research venture together with KU Leuven, UZ Leuven and VIB, which was called Mission Lucidity. The aim of the venture is to decode dementia. IMEC is creating human-specific living brain models, so called 'brains-on-chips’, to automate and miniaturize human stem cell manipulations, and engineer programmable, instrumented 3D brain models with single-cell precision. The project was supported by a Collaborative Science Award of one million dollars by the Chan Zuckerberg Initiative.

In 2018 he raised $137 million for the creation of imec.xpand, a venture capital fund that invests in innovative semiconductor and nanotechnology research spinouts and startups.
