= Ihor Huk =

Ihor Huk may refer to:

- Ihor Huk (footballer)
- Ihor Huk (surgeon)
