= Tom Otis =

American researcher, academic and author

- Occupations: Academic, researcher, author

Academic background
- Education: B.S., Biological Sciences; M.S., Biological Sciences; Ph.D., Neuroscience
- Alma mater: Stanford University

Academic work
- Institutions: University College London

Tom Otis is an American researcher, academic and author. He is the Chief Scientific Officer at the Sainsbury Wellcome Centre for Neural Circuits and Behaviour and holds a Professorship in Neuroscience at University College London.

Otis' research has been focused on cellular and circuit function of the cerebellum and hippocampus, as well as preclinical models of spinocerebellar ataxia and amyotrophic lateral sclerosis.

== Education ==
Otis received a B.S. and an M.S. in Biological Sciences in 1988 from Stanford University. He continued his education at Stanford University, where he received a Ph.D. in neuroscience in 1993. Otis’ doctoral work was completed in the laboratory of Istvan Mody at Stanford University and focused on fundamental aspects of inhibitory synaptic transmission. Using newly developed methods for patch clamping in brain slice preparations, Otis characterized the function of GABA-gated ion channels (GABAA receptors) and GABA activated G protein coupled receptors (GABAB receptors).

== Career ==
In 1998, Otis joined University of California, Los Angeles as an assistant professor, becoming associate professor in 2003 and full professor in 2007. He became the Edith Agnes Plumb Endowed Chair in Neurobiology at UCLA in 2013. He served as the vice chair of Department of Neurobiology at UCLA Medical Center from 2008 to 2013, and then as the chair of the Neurobiology Department from 2013 to 2015. From 2010 to 2014, he was the vice chair of interdepartmental graduate program in neuroscience at UCLA.

Otis took the position of vice director and section head of F. Hoffman-La Roche in 2015 while on leave of absence from UCLA, while on leave he led a team of 45 scientists conducting early-stage drug development in neurodevelopmental disorders. In 2017, Otis left Roche and moved to the United Kingdom, where he joined University College of London as a professor of neuroscience and the Sainsbury Wellcome Centre for Neural Circuits and Behaviour as chief scientific officer.

== Research and work ==
In postdoctoral work with Laurence Trussell at the University of Wisconsin, Madison, Otis studied excitatory synaptic transmission, measuring glutamate receptor activation at a giant synapse in the chick auditory brainstem and constructing models of neurotransmitter diffusion and receptor gating that explain how glutamate interacts with postsynaptic receptors. In postdoctoral work with Craig Jahr and Mike Kavanaugh, he used electrophysiological approaches and fast solution exchange to detail the biophysical function of glutamate transporters (the proteins responsible for removing glutamate from excitatory synapses).

In his own laboratory at UCLA, Otis extended this work to describe how glutamate transporters shape excitatory signals to different pools of glutamate receptors. He hypothesized that a feedback loop between G protein coupled glutamate receptors and glutamate transporters might regulate ‘spill over’ of glutamate from synapses, thereby ensuring that excitatory synapses remain independent.

Otis' laboratory also characterized the pharmacology of certain subtypes of GABAA receptors that are located extrasynaptically. In collaboration with the laboratory of Richard Olsen, he presented evidence that ethanol enhances these subtypes of GABAA receptors and that this likely contributes to the intoxicating and sedative effects of alcohol.

A main line of Otis' work has been directed at understanding how cerebellar circuits are involved in coordinating complex movements. Using optogenetics to manipulate cerebellar circuits, Otis showed that robust but artificial associative memories can be imparted such that otherwise innocuous sensory stimuli can then generate aberrant movements. These findings validate circuit-based models of cerebellar learning and suggest that learning may involve modifications at multiple sites in the cerebellar circuit.

In collaboration with the lab of Stefan Pulst, Otis’ team has characterized and studied mouse genetic models of spinocerebellar ataxia type 2. They examined Purkinje cell firing in cerebellar slices and found that the decreases in firing frequency began way before the detectable reductions in Purkinje cell number in the mouse model. Working with scientists at IONIS, the teams developed an antisense oligonucleotide targeting the SCA2 gene and showed that this molecule improves motor function in mice. Due to the involvement of SCA2 in stress granules in degenerating neurons, the same antisense oligonucleotide against SCA2 has potential to treat other misfolded protein disorders such as amyotrophic lateral sclerosis and frontotemporal dementia.

== Awards and honors ==
- 1989 - Howard Hughes Medical Institute Predoctoral Fellowship
- 1993 - National Research Service Award for Postdoctoral Training
- 2007 - Centre National de la Recherche Scientifique Fellow
- 2009 - McKnight Technology Award

== Selected publications ==
- Buhl, E. H., Otis, T. S., & Mody, I. (1996). Zinc-Induced Collapse of Augmented Inhibition by GABA in a Temporal Lobe Epilepsy Model. Science, 271(5247), 369–373.
- Fortin, D. L., Banghart, M. R., Dunn, T. W., Borges, K., Wagenaar, D. A., Gaudry, Q., … Kramer, R. H. (2008). Photochemical control of endogenous ion channels and cellular excitability. Nature Methods, 5(4), 331–338.
- Hanchar, H. J., Dodson, P. D., Olsen, R. W., Otis, T. S., & Wallner, M. (2005). Alcohol-induced motor impairment caused by increased extrasynaptic GABAA receptor activity. Nature Neuroscience, 8(3), 339–345.
- Mody, I., Koninck, Y. D., Otis, T., & Soltesz, I. (1994). Bridging the cleft at GABA synapses in the brain. Trends in Neurosciences, 17(12), 517–525.
- Otis, T. S., Koninck, Y. D., & Mody, I. (1993). Characterization of synaptically elicited GABAB responses using patch-clamp recordings in rat hippocampal slices. The Journal of Physiology, 463(1), 391–407.
- Otis, T. S., Koninck, Y. D., & Mody, I. (1994). Lasting potentiation of inhibition is associated with an increased number of gamma-aminobutyric acid type A receptors activated during miniature inhibitory postsynaptic currents. Proceedings of the National Academy of Sciences, 91(16), 7698–7702.
- Otis, T., & Mody, I. (1992). Modulation of decay kinetics and frequency of GABAA receptor-mediated spontaneous inhibitory postsynaptic currents in hippocampal neurons. Neuroscience, 49(1), 13–32.
- Otis, T., Wu, Y., & Trussell, L. (1996). Delayed clearance of transmitter and the role of glutamate transporters at synapses with multiple release sites. The Journal of Neuroscience, 16(5), 1634–1644.
- Sareen, D., Orourke, J. G., Meera, P., Muhammad, A. K. M. G., Grant, S., Simpkinson, M., … Baloh, R. H. (2013). Targeting RNA Foci in iPSC-Derived Motor Neurons from ALS Patients with a C9ORF72 Repeat Expansion. Science Translational Medicine, 5(208).
- Scoles, D., Schneider, M., Meera, P., Figueroa, K., Rigo, F., Bennett, F., Otis, T.S., Pulst, S.M. (2017) ATXN2 antisense therapy improves SCA2 mouse motor and Purkinje cell electrophysiological phenotypes, Nature, 544, 362-366.
- Staley, K. J., Otis, T. S., & Mody, I. (1992). Membrane properties of dentate gyrus granule cells: comparison of sharp microelectrode and whole-cell recordings. Journal of Neurophysiology, 67(5), 1346–1358.
