= Journal of Neurophysiology =

- Discipline: Neuroscience
- Language: English
- Edited by: Jan "Nino" Ramirez

Publication details
- History: 1938—present
- Publisher: American Physiological Society (United States)
- Frequency: Monthly
- Open access: After one year
- Impact factor: 2.5 (2022)

Standard abbreviations
- ISO 4: J. Neurophysiol.

Indexing
- CODEN: JONEA4
- ISSN: 0022-3077 (print); 1522-1598 (web)
- LCCN: 41016569
- OCLC no.: 01695642

Links
- Journal homepage; Online access; Online archive; Journal's Facebook Page; Journal of Neurophysiology on Twitter

The Journal of Neurophysiology is a monthly peer-reviewed scientific journal established in 1938. It is published by the American Physiological Society with Jan "Nino" Ramirez as its editor-in-chief. Ramirez is the Director for the Center for Integrative Brain Research at the University of Washington.

The Journal of Neurophysiology publishes original articles on the function of the nervous system. All levels of function are included, from membrane biophysics to cell biology to systems neuroscience and the experimental analysis of behavior. Experimental approaches include molecular neurobiology, cell culture and slice preparations, membrane physiology, developmental neurobiology, functional neuroanatomy, neurochemistry, neuropharmacology, systems electrophysiology, imaging and mapping techniques, and behavioral analysis. Experimental preparations may be invertebrate or vertebrate species, including humans. Theoretical studies are acceptable if they are tied closely to the interpretation of experimental data and elucidate principles of broad interest. The journal published some of the first functional neuroimaging studies.

The Journal's Deputy Editor is Reza Shadmehr. The current Associate Editors for the Journal of Neurophysiology are Robert M. Brownstone, Ansgar Buschges, Carmen C. Canavier, Christos Constantinidis, Leslie M. Kay, Zoe Kourtzi, M. Bruce MacIver, Hugo Merchant, Monica A. Perez, Albrecht Stroh, and Ana C. Takakura.

== Types of manuscripts published ==
The Journal of Neurophysiology publishes research reports of any length, review articles, Rapid Reports, Innovative Methodology reports, Case Studies in Neuroscience, and NeuroForums (brief commentaries on recent articles authored by graduate and postdoctoral students). Review article topics must be approved by the editor-in-chief prior to submission of the article. Rapid Reports are short papers presenting important new findings that could potentially have a major impact on the field. Rapid Reports submissions receive expedited peer review, and if accepted are highlighted on the journal's website. NeuroForum submissions must meet strict guidelines, and it is recommended that articles that are examined in NeuroForum submissions are pre-approved by the editor-in-chief. Case Studies in Neuroscience provides a forum for human or animal subjects studies that cannot be replicated experimentally (e.g., they report the neurological effects of a rare disease), but provide unique insights into mechanisms of neural function (either at the cellular or systems level). Clinical case studies are not appropriate for this category, and authors are encouraged to consult with the Editor-in-Chief to determine if their manuscript qualifies for submission as Case Studies in Neuroscience.
