= Leslie M. Kay =

American neuroscientist

- Education: St. John's College (Annapolis/Santa Fe); University of California, Berkeley; California Institute of Technology
- Children: 2
- Scientific career
- Fields: Neurophysiology, Computational neuroscience
- Institutions: University of Chicago
- Doctoral advisor: Walter Jackson Freeman III

Leslie M. Kay is an American neuroscientist and a Professor in the Department of Psychology at the University of Chicago. Her research studies the neurophysiology of the olfactory bulb and how behavioral context affects sensory processing.

Kay received her undergraduate education at St. John's College (Annapolis/Santa Fe) and obtained a PhD in biophysics from the University of California, Berkeley. She completed a postdoctoral research project at the California Institute of Technology under Gilles Laurent after graduating from her PhD program in 1995. She was appointed in 2000 as an assistant professor in the Department of Psychology at the University of Chicago. From 2008 to 2014 she served as the director of the Institute for Mind and Biology at the University of Chicago.

== Career ==
Kay graduated in 1983 with a Bachelor of Liberal Arts from St. John's College (Annapolis/Santa Fe) in Santa Fe, New Mexico. After graduating from St. John's College, Kay worked on the GenBank project at Los Alamos National Laboratory until 1985. Kay began her PhD at the University of California, Berkeley in 1985, but took a break from 1986 to 1990, during which she worked as an analyst and programmer and as a scientific reviewer for GenBank at Intelligenetics. Kay completed her dissertation research and received a PhD in Biophysics from the University of California, Berkey in 1995 under advisor Walter Jackson Freeman III. Her dissertation was titled Dynamic Interaction of Olfactory and Limbic Systems during Olfactory Perception.

From 1995 to 2000, Kay was a postdoctoral fellow in Biology and Computational Neuroscience at the California Institute of Technology. During her postdoctoral training in advisor Gilles Laurent's lab at Caltech, she studied how the responses of mitral cells in the olfactory bulb were affected by the behavioral context of the odor.

At The University of Chicago, Kay served as director of the Institute for Mind & Biology from 2008 to 2014 and as the chair of the Integrative Neuroscience graduate program from 2014 to 2016. She is also a member of the Grossman Institute for Neuroscience at The University of Chicago. Kay is an editor for multiple peer-reviewed scientific journals, including Behavioral Neuroscience and the Journal of Neurophysiology. For her research on how context reconfigures neural systems, Kay received a DARPA grant in 2018. Kay has also received multiple NIH grants for her research through the NIDCD. Additionally, Kay was invited to speak as part of the University of Florida's Center for Smell and Taste Seminar Series in 2017 and gave a presentation about neural oscillations and context in olfactory processing.

== Personal life ==
Kay is married to her wife of nearly 30 years, with whom she has two adult children. She is a member of 500 Queer Scientists and promotes LGBTQ visibility in science.

== Selected publications ==
- Kay, L.M. and Freeman, W.J. (1998) Bidirectional processing in the olfactory-limbic axis during olfactory behavior. Behavioral Neuroscience, 112(3): 541-553.
- Kay, L.M. and Laurent, G. (1999) Odor- and context-dependent modulation of mitral cell firing in behaving rats. Nature Neuroscience, 2(11): 1003-1009.
- Nusser, Z., Kay, L.M., Laurent, G., Homanics, G.E., Mody, I. (2001) Disruption of GABAA receptor mediated inhibition of GABAergic interneurons leads to increased synchrony of the olfactory bulb network. J. Neurophysiology 86(6): 2823-2833.
- Beshel, J., Kopell, N. and Kay, L.M. (2007) Olfactory bulb gamma oscillations are enhanced with task demands. Journal of Neuroscience, 27(31): 8358-8365.
- Kay, L.M., Beshel, J., Brea, J., Martin, C., Rojas-Líbano, D. & Kopell, N. (2009) Olfactory oscillations: the what, how and what for, Trends in Neurosciences, 32(4): 207-214.
- Kay, L.M. and Beshel, J. (2010) A beta oscillation network supports a gamma oscillation mode in the rat olfactory system during a 2-alternative choice odor discrimination task. Journal of Neurophysiology, 104(2):829-839.
- Rojas-Líbano, D., Frederick, D.E., Egaña, J.I. and Kay, L.M. (2014) The olfactory bulb theta rhythm follows all frequencies of diaphragmatic respiration in the freely behaving rat. Frontiers in Behavioral Neuroscience, 8:214. doi: 10.3389/fnbeh.2014.00214

== See also ==
- List of University of Chicago faculty
- List of Jewish American scientists
