= Annual Review of Vision Science =

- Discipline: Vision science
- Language: English
- Edited by: David H. Brainard; John H. R. Maunsell

Publication details
- History: 2015–present, 11 years old
- Publisher: Annual Reviews (US)
- Frequency: Annually
- Open access: Subscribe to Open
- Impact factor: 6.5 (2025)

Standard abbreviations
- ISO 4: Annu. Rev. Vis. Sci.

Indexing
- ISSN: 2374-4642 (print); 2374-4650 (web)

Links
- Journal homepage

The Annual Review of Vision Science is an academic journal published by Annual Reviews (AR). In publication since 2015, this journal covers significant developments in the field of vision science with an annual volume of review articles. As of 2023, it is being published as open access, under the Subscribe to Open model. It is currently edited by David H. Brainard and John H. R. Maunsell. As of 2026, Journal Citation Reports gives the journal a 2025 impact factor of 6.5, ranking it seventh of 98 journals in "Ophthalmology" and forty-fifth out of 330 in "Neurosciences".

== History ==
The Annual Review of Vision Science was first published in 2015 by Annual Reviews (AR), a nonprofit organization whose stated mission is to synthesize knowledge "for the progress of science and the benefit of society." Though it began with a physical edition, it is now only published electronically.

Its founding editors were J. Anthony Movshon and Brian Wandell. In 2021, Wandell was succeeded by David H. Brainard. Brainard and Movshon were joined by John H. R. Maunsell for 2023. From 2024 to 2026, Brainard and Maunsell were the editors. As of 2026, Maunsell and Farran Briggs became the editors.

== Scope and indexing ==
The Annual Review of Vision Science is multidisciplinary, including aspects of neuroscience, genetics, computer science, cell biology, and medicine. Reviews may cover optics, retina, visual perception, eye movement, visual processing, visual development, vision models, computer vision, and the mechanisms and treatments of diseases that affect vision. As of 2026, Journal Citation Reports lists the journal's 2025 impact factor as 6.5, ranking it seventh of 98 journal titles in the category "Ophthalmology" and 45th of 330 titles in "Neurosciences". It is abstracted and indexed in Scopus, Science Citation Index Expanded, and BIOSIS Previews, among others.

== Editorial processes ==
The Annual Review of Vision Science is helmed by the editor or the co-editors. The editor is assisted by the editorial committee, which includes associate editors, regular members, and occasionally guest editors. Guest members participate at the invitation of the editor, and serve terms of one year. All other members of the editorial committee are appointed by the AR board of directors and serve five-year terms. The editorial committee determines which topics should be included in each volume and solicits reviews from qualified authors. Unsolicited manuscripts are not accepted. Peer review of accepted manuscripts is undertaken by the editorial committee.
