= Brian Wandell =

American visual neuroscientist

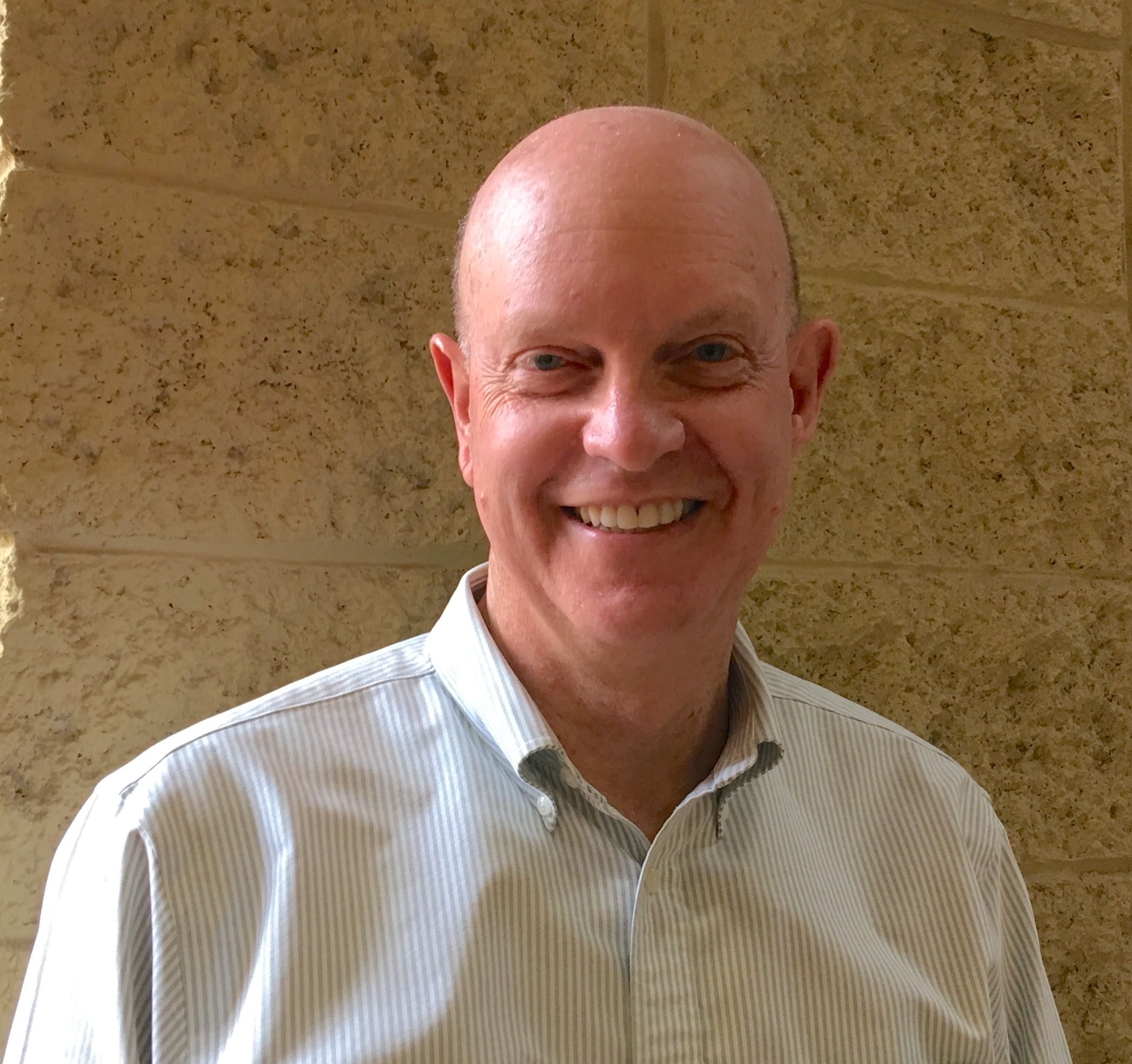
- Stanford neuroscientist Brian Wandell at Arizona State University SciAPP conference, March 7, 2019
- Awards: Troland Research Awards
- Scientific career
- Fields: Neuroscience, Vision
- Workplaces: Stanford University

Brian A. Wandell is the Isaac and Madeline Stein Family Professor at Stanford University, where he is Director of the Stanford Center for Cognitive and Neurobiological Imaging, and Deputy Director of the Wu Tsai Neuroscience Institute. He was a founding co-editor of the Annual Review of Vision Science.

== Research in Vision and Neuroscience ==
Wandell’s work in visual neuroscience employs both functional MRI and computational modeling to understand the action of the visual portions of the brain. His laboratory has worked to develop methods for identifying and measuring visual field maps in visual cortex. Recently, he and members of the laboratory have measured the reorganization of maps and cortical function following brain injury.

The Wandell lab is also studying human brain development. Specifically, they are measuring the responses in visual cortex of children, aged 8–12, as the children become skilled readers. He and his group are hoping to understand how visual signals and structures must develop to permit rapid, skilled reading. This work includes an array of techniques, including (functional MRI), diffusion tensor imaging (DTI), anatomical imaging, and behavioral testing.

Wandell authored the vision science textbook Foundations of Vision. He was elected to the National Academy of Sciences in 2003.

As Director of the Center for Cognitive and Neurobiological Imaging, Wandell has been an active advocate for making research data and algorithms available to the wider research community. According to Stanford,

An overall effort of the Wandell lab involves sharing data and computational methods with the broader scientific community. This work, which was funded by a grant from the National Science Foundation, supports that effort by providing data and a complete implementation of the method through the Stanford Digital Repository and GitHub.

Along with Laurence Maloney, Wandell was awarded the National Academy of Sciences' Troland Research Award in 1987 "For their elegant account of how we preserve the inherent colors of surfaces despite wide variations in illumination, and of Wandell's other fundamental investigations of color vision." In 1993, he was elected a Fellow of The Optical Society (OSA), and in 2008, he received the Edgar D. Tillyer Award from OSA.

== Research in Digital Imaging ==
Wandell's Vistalab is also actively involved in research related to digital imaging. In 2024 he co-authored a paper on creating and evaluating an HDR dataset for use in the automotive industry.

His lab also has a collection of datasets available for use in teaching and research hosted by Stanford's Digital Repository.
