= J. Anthony Movshon =

American neuroscientist

- Born: Joseph Anthony Movshon; December 10, 1950 (age 75); New York City, New York, U.S.
- Awards: António Champalimaud Vision Award 2010, National Academy of Sciences 2008, American Academy of Arts and Sciences 2009, Karl Spencer Lashley Award 2013
- Scientific career
- Fields: Neuroscience (Visual Neuroscience, Computational Neuroscience, Systems Neuroscience)
- Workplaces: New York University (professor)

Joseph Anthony Movshon ForMemRS (born December 10, 1950, in New York City) is an American neuroscientist. He has made contributions to the understanding of the brain mechanisms that represent the form and motion of objects, and the way these mechanisms contribute to perceptual judgments and visually guided movement. He is a founding co-editor of the Annual Review of Vision Science.

== Biography ==
Movshon studied at the University of Cambridge, obtaining his B.A. in 1972, and his Ph.D. under the supervision of Colin Blakemore in 1975. Since 1975 he has been a faculty member at New York University, where he is University Professor and Silver Professor and Director of the University's Center for Neural Science, which he founded in 1987. He also served on the Life Sciences jury for the Infosys Prize in 2016.

== Professional work ==
Movshon and collaborators pioneered the application of detection theory to the output of neurons in Visual cortex, to obtain a Neurometric function. This work led to the suggestion that a visual percept could be due to the activity of a handful of neurons. This suggestion found later support in studies where he collaborated with William Newsome to measure the neurometric function in the brain of the observer.

Movshon has contributed to understanding how visual information is processed in visual cortex, including computations for visual motion, and visual texture. Movshon has also contributed to understanding visual cortical development, its modification by visual experience, and its relation to the development of visual behavior, including the clinical visual disorder of amblyopia.

== Honors ==
Movshon received the António Champalimaud Vision Award in 2010. He was elected to the National Academy of Sciences in 2008, and to the American Academy of Arts and Sciences in 2009. Movshon was elected a Fellow of the Royal Society as a Foreign Member (ForMemRS) in May 2024.
