= Michael Stryker =

American neuroscientist

Michael P. Stryker
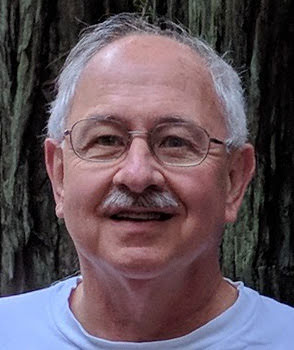
- Born: June 16, 1947 (age 79); Savannah, GA
- Education: Deep Springs College; University of Michigan (BA); MIT (PhD)
- Occupation: Neurobiologist
- Employer(s): University of California, San Francisco

Michael Paul Stryker (born June 16, 1947) is an American neuroscientist specializing in studies of how spontaneous neural activity organizes connections in the developing mammalian brain, and for research on the organization, development, and plasticity of the visual system in the ferret and the mouse.

== Early life ==
Stryker was born in Savannah, Georgia, in 1947 to George B. Stryker, Jr., a civil engineer, and Estelle R Stryker (née Nulman), a nurse. He studied liberal arts at Deep Springs College and then the University of Michigan, where he graduated in philosophy and mathematics. After college, he joined the Peace Corps to work on water development in Kenya .

== Professional education and career ==
In graduate school he studied neurophysiology at the new Department of Psychology and Brain Science (now Brain and Cognitive Sciences) at Massachusetts Institute of Technology, first working with Peter Schiller on the coding of eye movement and vision in the mammalian superior colliculus. He and Schiller created the first computer-driven optical display capable of randomly interleaving sharply focused bar and edge stimuli and recording the responses of neurons in the visual system to measure their tuning properties . With fellow student Helen Sherk, he used this apparatus to demonstrate innately selective responses in the visual cortex, confirming earlier qualitative studies of David Hubel and Torsten Wiesel, and to reveal that the effect of restricted rearing was to preserve innately selective responses rather than to instruct the development of neurons to reflect visual experience. He received his Ph.D. in 1975.

Stryker pursued postdoctoral research in Department of Neurobiology, Harvard Medical School under Torsten Wiesel and David Hubel, working also with fellows Carla Shatz, Simon LeVay, and Bill Harris. With Shatz and Peter Kirwood, he taught a summer course at Cold Spring Harbor Laboratory.

He joined the nascent Neuroscience Program at the University of California, San Francisco as a member of the Department of Physiology. There, his laboratory demonstrated a role for spontaneous neural activity, as distinguished from visual experience, in the prenatal and postnatal development of the central visual system. He and his students created mathematical models of cortical development. He pioneered the use of the ferret for studies of the central visual system and used this species to delineate the role of neural activity in the development of orientation selectivity and cortical columns. His laboratory revealed a role for slow-wave sleep in cortical plasticity and pioneered the modern use of the mouse visual system, demonstrating rapid activity-dependent plasticity during a defined critical period and delineating distinct molecular mechanisms responsible for temporally distinct phases of plasticity. In collaboration with the Feldheim group at University of California, Santa Cruz, he revealed the interaction between neural activity and molecular signaling mechanisms responsible for the formation of azimuth maps in visual cortex and superior colliculus and their connections His and the Alvarez-Buylla laboratory discovered that transplantation of embryonic inhibitory neurons into postnatal visual cortex induces a second critical period of juvenile plasticity. He and his colleagues made the discovery of the regulation of visual cortical state by locomotion and delineated much of the neural circuitry responsible. At UCSF, he has authored over 150 publications.

== Personal life ==
He has been married to Barbara Poetter since 1978. They have 4 children born between 1980 and 1995. They live in Marin County north of San Francisco.

== Awards, recognition, and public service ==
Stryker is a Fellow of the American Association for the Advancement of Science and an elected member of the American Academy of Arts and Sciences and the National Academy of Sciences. He holds the William Francis Ganong Chair of Physiology at UCSF and has held the Cattedra Galileiana (Galileo Galilei Chair of Science) at Scuola Normale Superiore di Pisa. He has received the W. Alden Spencer Award from Columbia University, the Pepose Vision Sciences Award from Brandeis University, the Stein Innovator Award from Research to Prevent Blindness, the Krieg Cortical Kudos Discoverer Award from the Cajal Club, and the Ralph W. Gerard Prize in Neuroscience from the Society for Neuroscience. He has served on and chaired the board of trustees of Deep Springs College, CA, and serves on the board of directors of the Allen Institute in Seattle, WA.
