= New York University Center for Neural Science =

Research institute at New York University

Coordinates: 40.728997°N 73.994228°W

- Founder: J. Anthony Movshon
- Established: 1989
- Address: 4 Washington Place, New York, NY 10003
- Location: New York, NY, United States
- Website: as.nyu.edu/cns.html

The New York University Center for Neural Science is a research institution founded in 1989 by members of the New York University Psychology Department, following a major funding drive. Its founder was J. Anthony Movshon, who has been director ever since, with brief interruptions. The center has 25 faculty members. Among them are three members of the National Academy of Sciences: J. Anthony Movshon, David Heeger, and Joseph E. LeDoux. Thanks to the work of Paul Glimcher, it is one of the birthplaces of neuroeconomics. Thanks to the work of Joseph LeDoux, it has been a prime center for the study of emotions and the amygdala.
