= John H. R. Maunsell =

British-American neuroscientist

- Born: 1955 (age 70–71); Great Baddow, England
- Citizenship: United Kingdom
- Education: Duke University; California Institute of Technology
- Scientific career
- Workplaces: University of Rochester; Baylor College of Medicine; Howard Hughes Medical Institute; Harvard Medical School; University of Chicago

John Henry Richard Maunsell (born 1955) is a British-American neuroscientist who is the Albert D. Lasker Distinguished Service Professor of Neurobiology at the University of Chicago. He is a fellow of the American Academy of Arts & Sciences and the American Association for the Advancement of Science, and a member of the U. S. National Academy of Sciences. Formerly the editor-in-chief of The Journal of Neuroscience, as of 2021 he is a co-editor of the Annual Review of Vision Science.

== Early life and education ==
John Henry Richard Maunsell was born in Great Baddow, Essex, England in 1955 younger son of Henry Ian Geoffrey Maunsell (1924–2013), of New Jersey, USA, an electronic engineer with Bell Telephone Laboratories, and Stella Christine, daughter of Leonard Vincent Labrow, of Moreton, Maybury Hill, Woking, Surrey. The Maunsell family are Irish landed gentry. He attended Duke University for his bachelor's degree in zoology, graduating in 1977. He then attended the California Institute of Technology, graduating with a PhD in biology in 1982. Maunsell completed a postdoctoral research appointment at Massachusetts Institute of Technology with neuroscientist Peter Schiller.

== Career ==
In 1985 Maunsell was hired as an assistant professor of physiology at the University of Rochester; he was promoted to associate professor in 1991. From 1992 to 2006 he was a professor of neuroscience at Baylor College of Medicine, followed by an endowed professorship at Harvard Medical School as the Alice and Rodman W. Moorhead III Professor of Neurobiology from 2006 to 2014. From 1997 to 2011 he was additionally an investigator at Howard Hughes Medical Institute. He joined the faculty of the University of Chicago in 2014, where he remains employed as of 2025 as the Albert D. Lasker Distinguished Service Professor of Neurobiology. He is also the inaugural Director of the University of Chicago's Neuroscience Institute.

He was editor-in-chief of The Journal of Neuroscience from 2007 to 2014. As of 2021, he is a co-editor of the Annual Review of Vision Science.

== Awards and honors ==
Maunsell was elected a fellow of the American Association for the Advancement of Science in 2002. In 2014 he was elected as a fellow of the American Academy of Arts & Sciences. In 2021, he was elected member of the U. S. National Academy of Sciences.
