= Ataxin-2 =

Mammalian protein found in humans

ATXN2

Identifiers
- Aliases: ATXN2, ALS13, ATX2, SCA2, TNRC13, ataxin 2
- External IDs: OMIM: 601517; MGI: 1277223; GeneCards: ATXN2
Available structures
PDB	Ortholog search: PDBe RCSB
PDB	List of PDB id codes 3KTR

Gene location (Human)
Chr.	Chromosome 12 (human)
Band	12q24.12	Start	111,443,485 bp
Band	12q24.12	End	111,599,676 bp

Gene location (Mouse)
Chr.	Chromosome 5 (mouse)
Band	5|5 F	Start	121,711,337 bp
Band	5|5 F	End	121,816,493 bp
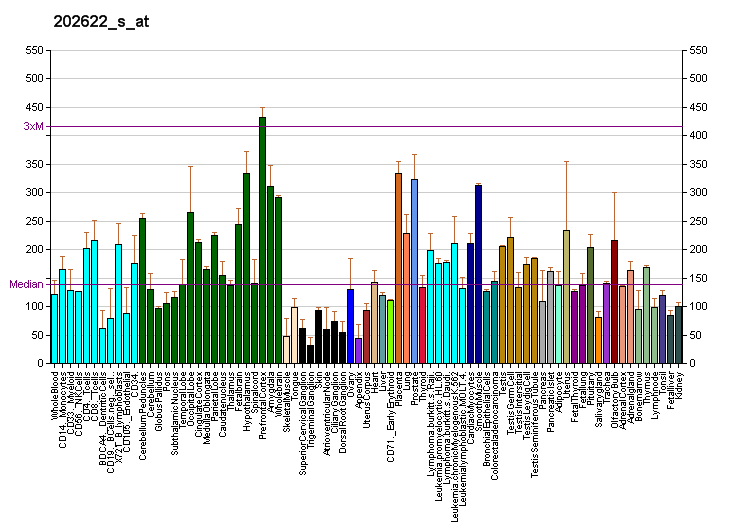
RNA expression pattern
Bgee	Human / Mouse (ortholog); Top expressed in: buccal mucosa cell; epithelium of colon; olfactory bulb; sural nerve; ventricular zone; gonad; right uterine tube; C1 segment; right hemisphere of cerebellum; right ovary / Top expressed in: internal carotid artery; genital tubercle; tail of embryo; neural layer of retina; external carotid artery; Ileal epithelium; zygote; cumulus cell; secondary oocyte; Rostral migratory stream; More reference expression data
BioGPS	More reference expression data
Gene ontology
Molecular function	epidermal growth factor receptor binding; protein C-terminus binding; protein binding; RNA binding
Cellular component	cytoplasm; perinuclear region of cytoplasm; polysome; trans-Golgi network; Golgi apparatus; cytoplasmic stress granule; membrane; cytosol; ribonucleoprotein complex
Biological process	regulation of cytoplasmic mRNA processing body assembly; stress granule assembly; RNA metabolic process; regulation of translation; P-body assembly; RNA transport; negative regulation of receptor internalization
Sources:Amigo / QuickGO
Orthologs
Databases	NCBI: entry; OMA: entry
Species	Human	Mouse
Entrez	6311	20239
Ensembl	ENSG00000204842	ENSMUSG00000042605
UniProt	Q99700	O70305
RefSeq (mRNA)	NM_001310121; NM_001310123; NM_002973; NM_001372574	NM_009125; NM_001359153
RefSeq (protein)	NP_001297050; NP_001297052; NP_002964; NP_001359503	NP_033151; NP_001346082
Location (UCSC)	Chr 12: 111.44 – 111.6 Mb	Chr 5: 121.71 – 121.82 Mb
PubMed search
- Wikidata
View/Edit Human	View/Edit Mouse

Ataxin-2 is a protein that in humans is encoded by the ATXN2 gene. Mutations in ATXN2 cause spinocerebellar ataxia type 2 (SCA2).

== Protein structure ==
Ataxin-2 contains the following protein domains:

- Two LSm domains, which likely allow it to bind RNA
- A PAM2 motif, predicted to associate with the poly(A)-binding protein
- A polyglutamine tract in some species (located near the amino terminal in primates and between the LSm domains in insects)

A potential transcript variant, missing an internal coding exon, has been described; however, its full-length nature is not certain.

== Species, tissue, and subcellular distribution ==
ATXN2 is conserved across eukaryotes. Most vertebrates have two orthologs of the gene (called ATXN2 and ATXN2L in humans), with the exception of birds which only have one. Plant species have two to six ATXN2 orthologs.

ATXN2 is ubiquitously expressed in different tissues. Within individual cells, it localizes to the Golgi apparatus and stress granules.

== Function ==
Ataxin-2 is involved in regulating mRNA translation through its interactions with the poly(A)-binding protein. It is also involved in the formation of stress granules and P-bodies, which also play roles in RNA regulation.

== Clinical significance ==
=== Spinocerebellar ataxia type 2 (SCA2) ===
The polyglutamine tract in human ataxin-2 is unstable and can expand as it is transmitted across generations. Normal alleles usually have 22 or 23 repeats, but can contain up to 31 repeats. Longer expansions can cause spinocerebellar ataxia type 2 (SCA2), a fatal progressive genetic disorder in which neurons degenerate in the cerebellum, inferior olive, pons, and other areas. Symptoms of SCA2 include ataxia (a loss of coordinated movements), parkinsonism, and dementia in some cases. The disease allele usually contains 34-52 CAG repeats, but can contain as few as 32 or more than 100, and can expand in size when transmitted to successive generations. How the polyglutamine expansion in ataxin-2 leads to these symptoms is unknown.

=== Amyotrophic lateral sclerosis (ALS) ===
In 2010, work from Aaron Gitler and Nancy Bonini at the University of Pennsylvania discovered that intermediate-size CAG repeat expansions are significantly associated with risk for developing amyotrophic lateral sclerosis (Lou Gehrig's disease).

=== Primary open-angle glaucoma (POAG) and intraocular pressure (IOP) ===
Genome-wide association studies have revealed a significant association of ATXN2 variants with POAG and IOP. Further investigation of the genetic and biological mechanisms underlying the association between ATXN2 and POAG could provide valuable insights into the pathogenesis and potential therapeutic targets for glaucoma.
