= David H. Brainard =

American psychologist

- Born: 1960 (age 64–65); New Haven, Connecticut
- Citizenship: US
- Education: Harvard University; Stanford University
- Scientific career
- Institutions: University of California, Santa Barbara; University of Pennsylvania

David Hoyt Brainard (born 1960) is an American psychologist who researches visual perception. He is the RRL Professor of Psychology at the University of Pennsylvania, fellow of The Optical Society, Association for Research in Vision and Ophthalmology, and the Association for Psychological Science, and co-editor of the Annual Review of Vision Science.

== Early life and education ==
David Hoyt Brainard was born in 1960 in New Haven, Connecticut. His father was former Yale University economist William Brainard and his mother is Ellen née Rawlings. Brainard attended Harvard University for his bachelor's degree in physics, graduating in 1982. He then Stanford University for his master's degree in electrical engineering and doctoral degree in psychology. After his PhD, he completed post-doctoral research at University of Rochester.

== Career ==
In 1991 he was hired as an assistant professor of psychology at the University of California, Santa Barbara. He was promoted to associate professor in 1995 and full professor in 1999. In 2001 he joined the faculty of the University of Pennsylvania as a professor of psychology. From 2005 to 2010, he served as the chair of the department of psychology. In 2014, he received an endowed professorship, becoming the first recipient of the RRL Professor of Psychology. As of 2021, he is a co-editor of the Annual Review of Vision Science.

Brainard researches visual perception, visual neuroscience, and visual processing. He is interested in how vision allows perception about an object's properties, especially color.

== Awards and honors ==
He is an elected fellow of The Optical Society, Association for Research in Vision and Ophthalmology, and the Association for Psychological Science. In 2021 The Optical Society awarded him the Edgar D. Tillyer Award for his "groundbreaking experimental and theoretical contributions to our understanding of how the visual system resolves the ambiguities inherent in sensory signals to produce a stable percept of object color".
