= David Heeger =

David J. Heeger
- Born: 1961 (age 64–65); Berkeley, California, U.S.
- Education: University of Pennsylvania
- Awards: David Marr Prize 1987, Alfred P. Sloan Research Fellowship 1994, Troland Research Award 2002, National Academy of Sciences 2013.
- Scientific career
- Fields: Neuroscience (Visual Neuroscience, Computational Neuroscience, Systems Neuroscience, perceptual psychology, cognitive neuroscience, image processing, computer vision, computer graphics
- Workplaces: New York University (professor)
- Doctoral advisor: Ruzena Bajcsy

David J. Heeger (born 1961) is an American neuroscientist, psychologist, computer scientist, data scientist, and entrepreneur. He is a professor at New York University, Chief Scientific Officer of Statespace Labs, and Chief Scientific Officer and co-founder of Epistemic AI.

== Research ==
Heeger's academic research spans a cross-section of engineering, psychology, and neuroscience. In the fields of perceptual psychology, systems neuroscience, cognitive neuroscience, and computational neuroscience, Heeger has developed computational theories of neuronal processing in the visual system, and he has performed psychophysics (perceptual psychology) and neuroimaging (functional magnetic resonance imaging, fMRI) experiments on human vision. His primary contribution to computational neuroscience is a theory of neural processing called the normalization model. His experimental research has contributed to our understanding of the topographic organization of visual cortex (retinotopy), visual awareness, visual pattern detection/discrimination, visual motion perception, stereopsis (depth perception), attention, working memory, the control of eye and hand movements, neural processing of complex audio-visual and emotional experiences (movies, music, narrative), abnormal visual processing in dyslexia, and neurophysiological characteristics of autism.

In the fields of image processing, computer vision, and computer graphics, Heeger has worked on motion estimation and image registration, wavelet image representations, anisotropic diffusion (edge-preserving noise reduction), image fidelity metrics (for evaluating image data compression algorithms), and texture analysis/synthesis.

Heeger's current research focuses on developing and testing a unified theory of cortical circuit function. The field of neuroscience needs a general theory of brain function, like Maxwell's Equations for the brain. There is considerable evidence that the brain relies on a set of canonical neural circuits that perform a set of canonical neural computations, repeating them across brain regions and modalities to apply operations of the same form. But we lack a theoretical framework for how such canonical computations can support a wide variety of cognitive processes and brain functions. Heeger developed a class of circuit models, called Oscillatory Recurrent Gated Neural Integrator Circuits (ORGaNICs), that recapitulate many key neurophysiological and cognitive/perceptual phenomena including sensory processing and attention in visual cortex, working memory in prefrontal and parietal cortex, and premotor activity and motor control in motor cortex. The theory offers a unified framework for the dynamics of neural activity, and it recapitulates many key neurophysiological and cognitive/perceptual phenomena (including normalization, oscillatory activity, sustained delay-period activity, sequential activity and traveling waves of activity), measured with a wide range of methodologies (including intracellular recordings of membrane potential fluctuations, firing rates of individual neurons, optogenetic manipulations, local field potentials, neuroimaging, and behavioral performance).

== Education and career ==
Heeger holds a bachelor's degree in mathematics as well as a master's degree and doctorate in computer science—all from the University of Pennsylvania. He was a postdoctoral fellow at MIT, a research scientist at the NASA-Ames Research Center, and an associate professor at Stanford before joining NYU.

== Personal life ==
His father, Alan J. Heeger, is an American physicist who was awarded the Nobel Prize in chemistry in 2000.

== Awards ==
- 1987 David Marr Prize in computer vision.
- 1994 Alfred P. Sloan Research Fellowship in neuroscience.
- 2002 Troland Research Award in psychology from the National Academy of Sciences.
- 2006 Margaret and Herman Sokol Faculty Award in the Sciences from New York University in 2006.
- 2013 Elected to the National Academy of Sciences.
