= Spinocerebellar ataxia type 2 =

- Other names: Spinocerebellar ataxia, Cuban type; Spinocerebellar atrophy 2, Olivopontocerebellar atrophy, Holguin type; Olivopontocerebellar atrophy, 2; Wadia-Swami syndrome
- Specialty: Neurology, genetics
- Causes: CAG expansion in ATXN2 gene
- Treatment: Symptomatic
- Frequency: 0.005%

Spinocerebellar ataxia type 2 (SCA2) is a rare genetic disorder, which causes coordination and balance problems. Symptoms that precede onset of the disorder include sleep issues, problems with balance, malfunction of autonomic nervous system, and disturbed sense of smell. As the condition progresses, common symptoms include slurred speech, unsteadiness, muscle cramps, head tremors, slowed or restricted eye movements, and reduced reflexes in the legs. Lip muscle twitch, and abnormal stiffness of the muscle are other common features.

The disorder is autosomal dominant, meaning it can be inherited from a single parent. It is caused by an abnormally long, repeated DNA sequence in the ATXN2 gene, which leads to the production of an altered ataxin-2 protein that damages nerve cells over time.

SCA2 is the second most common disorder among SCAs. It is common in Cuba, India, Italy, and South Africa. SCA2 can be suspected based on symptoms and confirmed by genetic testing. Treatment usually consists of physical, speech, and occupational therapy and drug therapy. Average life expectancy is more than 20 years after disease onset. In more severe cases, it can begin in childhood and cause developmental delay or loss of skills, and life expectancy is much decreased.

== Signs and symptoms ==
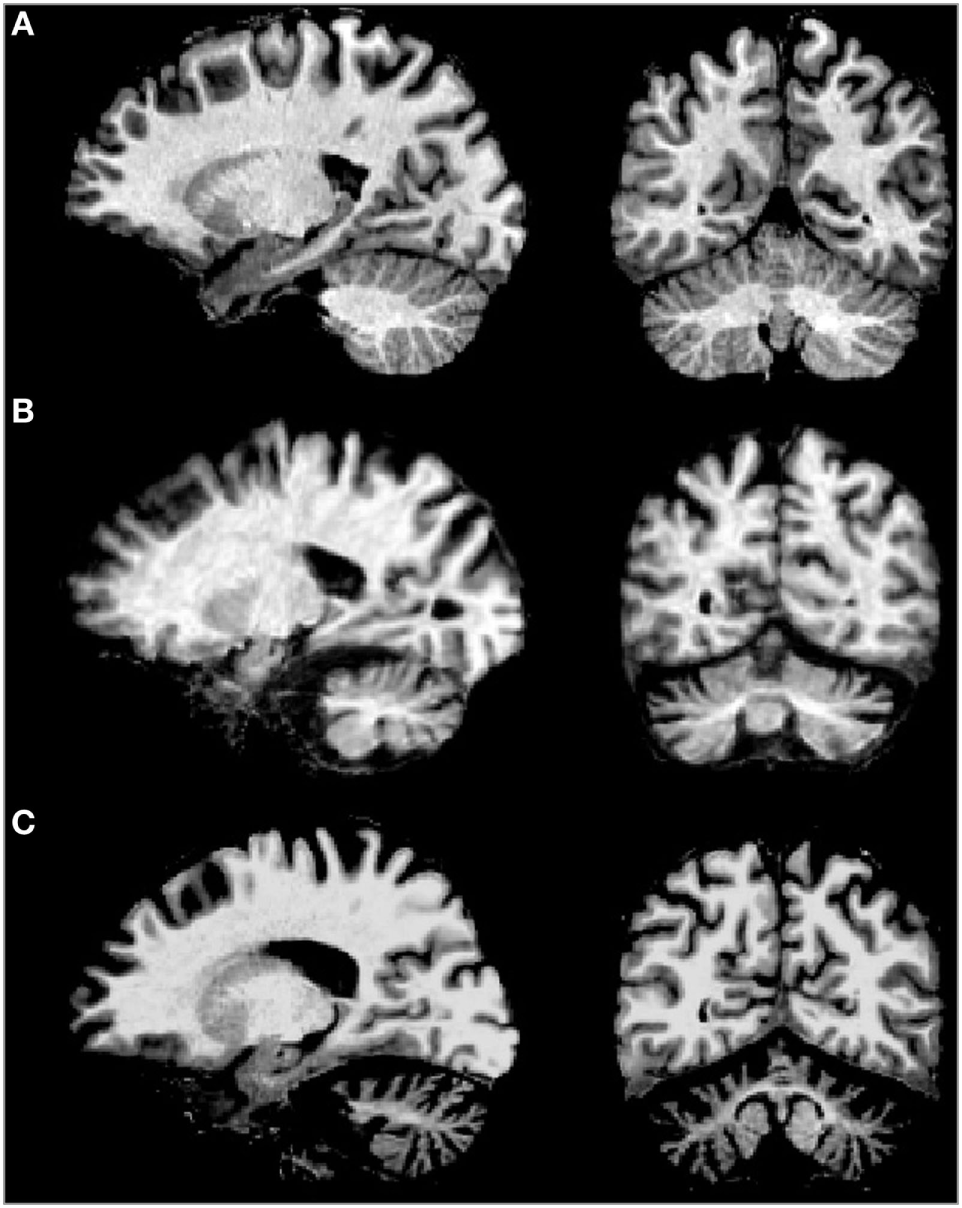
In Fig.A normal brain MRI can be seen. In Fig.B it shows early signs of SCA2, and in Fig.C it shows all signs of SCA2. Cerebellar white and gray matter loss can be seen.

SCA2 usually has 3 stages: asymptomatic, prodrome, and ataxic stage. In some cases, one can experience parkinsonism as sole symptom, and some people can develop ALS in case of intermediate CAG expansions. It usually begins at the age of 40 and average life expectancy is more than 20 years after disease onset.

=== Stages ===
==== Asymptomatic and prodrome stage ====
In the asymptomatic stage, an individual does not develop any signs of this disorder. In the prodrome, development of sleep issues, muscle cramps, defects in sway control, dysautonomia, olfactory disorder, exaggerated reflexes, positive Babinski sign, sensory issues, and slowing of saccades can be seen; it can precede the ataxic stage up to 15 years. Also, MRI shows volume loss in the pons and in specific frontal and parietal areas.

==== Ataxic stage ====
In this stage individuals can experience slowing of saccades, truncal ataxia, dysmetria, dysdiadochokinesia, dysarthria, postural instability, and occasionally decreased muscle tone. As the disorder progresses, muscle twitch of arm and mouth, ophthalmoparesis, difficulty in swallowing, sphincter function disruption, myoclonus, dystonia, neuronopathy, chorea, and dementia can be seen.

Purkinje cells show poor branching and torpedo-like malformation of axons. Parallel fibers are scant, and Purkinje cells and granule cells are decreased in number. MRI shows atrophy of the white matter of the cerebellum, middle cerebellar peduncle, corticospinal tract, and pons. Later, atrophy spreads to cerebellar grey matter and cerebro-cerebellar tract. In severe stages, there is a severe degeneration of the corpus striatum, cortex, and thalamus.

=== Early onset ===
In infantile onset, SCA2 begins at an age of 0–1. An individual first experiences developmental delays with hypotonia which then progresses into rapid developmental regression with epilepsy, and gaze aversion; individuals usually die at the age of 0.5–3 years.

Juvenile-onset SCA2 starts at the age of 2–15. One can experience cerebellar tremor and ataxia at first, which then progresses into regression, oculomotor disease, and involvement of extrapyramidal and peripheral nervous system; a person usually dies between the ages of 26 and 50.

=== Parkinsonism ===
Parkinsonism is a term for motor symptoms, which include hypokinesia, tremors, and rigidity. On some occasions one can develop parkinsonism which responds well to levodopa, some people might additionally develop ataxia.

=== ALS ===
ALS is a neurodegenerative condition which causes death of motor neurons. Intermediate expansion (30–33 repeats) of CAG in the ATXN2 gene increases risk of ALS, and some people develop SCA2 and ALS at the same time.

== Cause ==
SCA2 is an autosomal dominant condition, which means that a mutation in one copy of the gene is enough to cause the disorder. SCA2 is caused by (CAG)_{n} nucleotides expansion in the gene ATXN2. Normally, ATXN2 contains up to 31 repeats, although 30–33 repeats can increase risk of ALS. Individuals with SCA2 usually have between 33 to over 200 CAG repeats; homozygous alleles (having both copies of the gene affected) with only 31 repeats can occasionally lead to the disease. Anticipation (a phenomenon where symptoms get worse each generation) can be seen in this disorder; usually fathers pass more CAG repeats. Interruption by (CAA)_{n} repeats can confer stability to expansion.

Repeats associated with SCA2
Age of onset	Repeat size
Normal allele	31 or fewer CAG
ALS-predisposing allele	30–33 CAG
Reduced penetrance	33–34 CAG
Full penetrance	35 or more CAG

== Mechanism ==
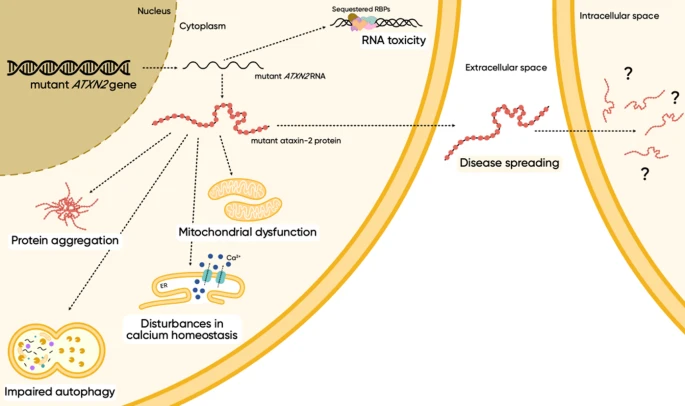
Both repeat-expanded sense and anti-sense transcripts of ATXN2 can form hairpin structures and cause toxicity, presumably by sequestering RBPs into RNA foci. A polyQ-expanded ATXN2 protein is prone to form cytoplasmic aggregates that recruits other proteins, such as ataxin-1, ataxin-3, and TBP. The accumulation of SQSTM1 and LC3-II indicates a dysfunction of autophagy, suggesting that neurons struggle to clear out damaged and aggregated proteins. Additionally, low levels of PINK1 in people with SCA2 indicate mitochondrial dysfunction and enhanced oxidative stress, which can contribute to neuroinflammation and neuronal death. Mutant ATXN2 interacts with the ER InsP3R1 and increases its sensitivity to IP3, resulting in high calcium leakage into the cytosol that can trigger excitotoxicity and neurodegeneration. Interneuronal transfer of mutant ATXN2 could constitute a mechanism contributing to SCA2 progression.

Ataxin-2 is a protein which contains 1312 amino acids; its polyglutamine stretch is located near the N-terminus in the coding region of exon 1. CAG and CAA nucleotides expansion causes stretching of the polyglutamine tract, which in turn might make the ataxin-2 protein accumulate and form inclusion bodies in neurons; these inclusion bodies contain other proteins, such as ataxin-1, ataxin-3.

These mutated proteins cause disruption of endoplasmic reticulum membrane by BAX insertion, which in turn activates caspase-7 and might lead to apoptosis (programmed cell death). Also, superoxide dismutase levels are elevated, while catalase levels are decreased, which causes oxidative stress and mitochondrial dysfunction.

=== Dysfunction of autophagy ===
Autophagy is a process in which a cell digest itself (by removing and recycling proteins and organelles) in order to maintain homeostasis. In SCA2 this process is hampered, which is evident by accumulation of p62/SQSTM1 and LC3-II (both of them are autophagy markers).

=== RNA toxicity ===
The ATXN2 locus encodes 2 transcripts, one of which is ATXN2-AS. ATXN2-AS has CUG repeats which are toxic; CUG repeats bind to MBNL1 protein and causes APP and NMDA-R1 messenger RNA missplicing. ATXN2 sense transcripts cause abnormal interaction with TBL3, which hampers ribosomal RNA maturation and contributes to apoptosis of neurons.

=== Issues in calcium homeostasis ===
A2BP1 normally binds to the ATXN2 C-terminus, which in turn targets exon 5 of GLUN1 (NMDA receptor subunit), but in SCA2, A2BP1 cannot bind to mutated ATXN2, which in turn causes missplicing of GLUN1 and can trigger excitotoxicity (by increased levels of calcium ions) which causes apoptosis. Also, SCA2-induced pluripotent stem cells show altered expression of other glutamate receptor subunit genes (such as GRM3 and GRIA4) which again can cause excitotoxicity. Mutated ataxin-2 binds to inositol 1,4,5-trisphosphate receptor in the endoplasmic reticulum membrane, and causes release of calcium into the cytoplasm; there is an alteration in the expression of the calcium channels and transporters, and genes related to Inositol trisphosphate metabolism and calmodulin dependent kinases. There is an upregulation of SAM68 protein which causes NRXN1 mRNA to be spliced to specific isoforms which alters connections between Purkinje and granule cells.

=== Alteration of stress granule dynamics ===
Ataxin-2 is a part of stress granules (cell component without cell membrane that contains mRNAs, and translation factors which are formed as a response to stress) and interacts with TDP-43 and STAU1; mutated ataxin-2 causes faulty placement of TDP-43 and there is an overabundance of STAU1; STAU impairs the assembly of stress granules.

== Diagnosis ==
A suspicion of SCA2 can be raised based on symptoms (such as slowing of saccades, ataxia), and by family history; diagnosis can be confirmed by genetic testing of CAG expansion in the ATXN2 gene.

Polymerase chain reaction (PCR) can be used to detect CAG expansion less than 100, but southern blotting (a laboratory technique to study DNA) can be used to detect expansions of more than 100.

== Treatment ==
The disorder does not have a cure, but supportive care is possible. Physiotherapy can improve gait, coordination, and posture. Speech and occupational therapy is also used and it is considered mainstay. Pharmacological treatments, such as high-doses of vitamin B, magnesium, mexiletine, quinine might alleviate muscle cramps; anticholinergics and dopaminergics are effective in management of dystonia, hypokinesia, and tremor. Postural tremor can be treated using deep brain stimulation.

== Epidemiology ==
SCA2 is the second most common disorder among SCAs, accounting for approximately 15% of cases. This disorder is common in India and Cuba, especially in the province of Holguin with an incidence of 4 in every 10,000. It is also common in South Africa, Italy, Venezuela, and Mexico.

== Research ==
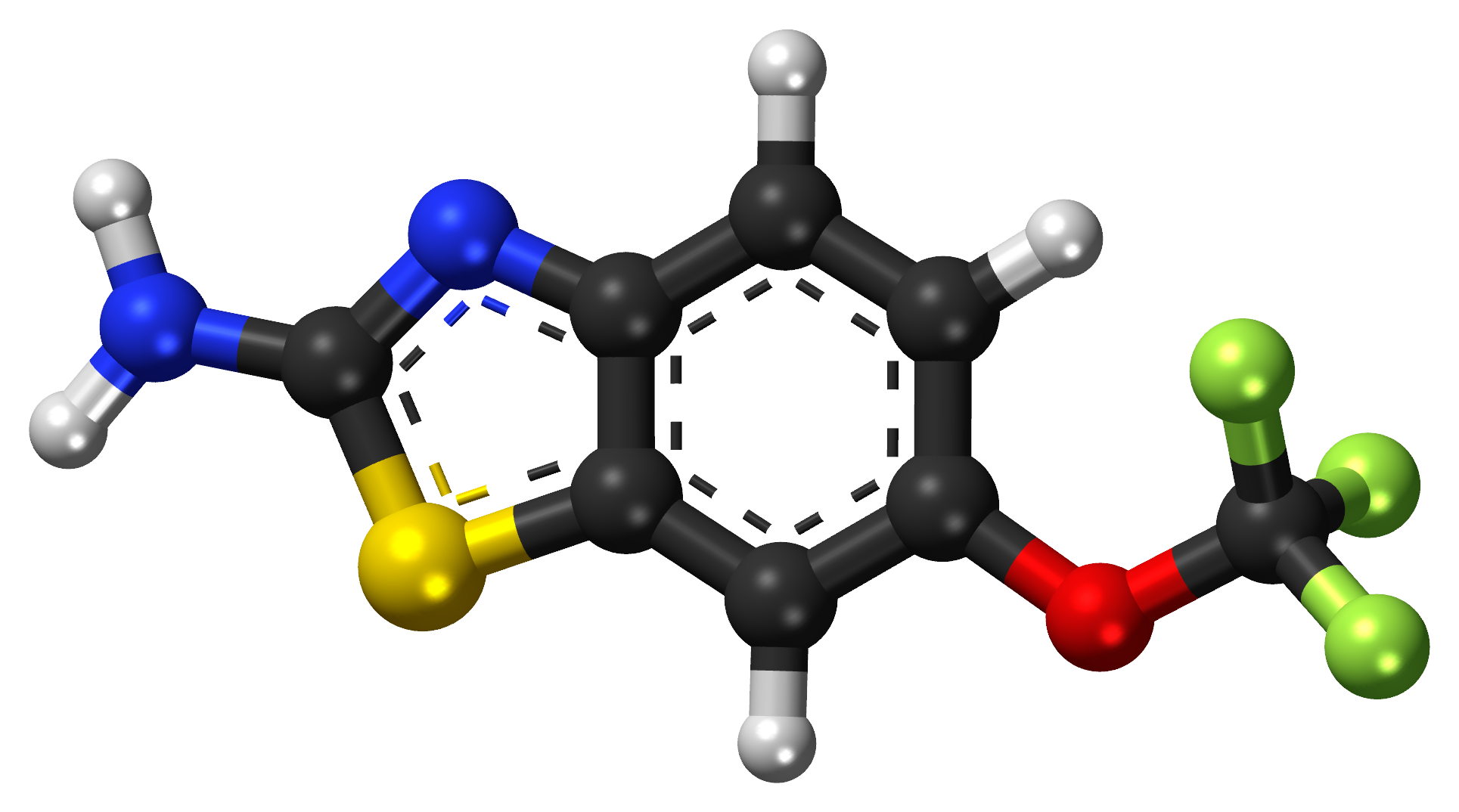
Riluzole

In 2011, researchers showed that zinc supplementation in 36 individuals with SCA2, decreased symptoms of ataxia, dysdiadochokinesia, and slowed saccades. In 2014, researchers showed that lithium did not improve symptoms or brain volume, but it showed decreased points in Beck depression inventory test in 16 individuals with SCA2. Later, in 2022, researchers showed that riluzole did not show any effects in individuals with SCA2.

In 2017, researchers used ASOs in mice models of SCA2 which showed positive results; specifically it decreased levels of ataxin-2 and improved motor function.

== History ==
Wadia and Swami reported 9 Indian families with SCA2 in 1971. In 1993, Gispert and colleagues mapped SCA2 to the long arm of chromosome 12, and later ATXN2 was discovered by Pulst and colleagues.

In 2010, Elden and colleagues showed that intermediate CAG expansion in ATXN2 increased risk for ALS.
