= IMEC =

International research and development organization

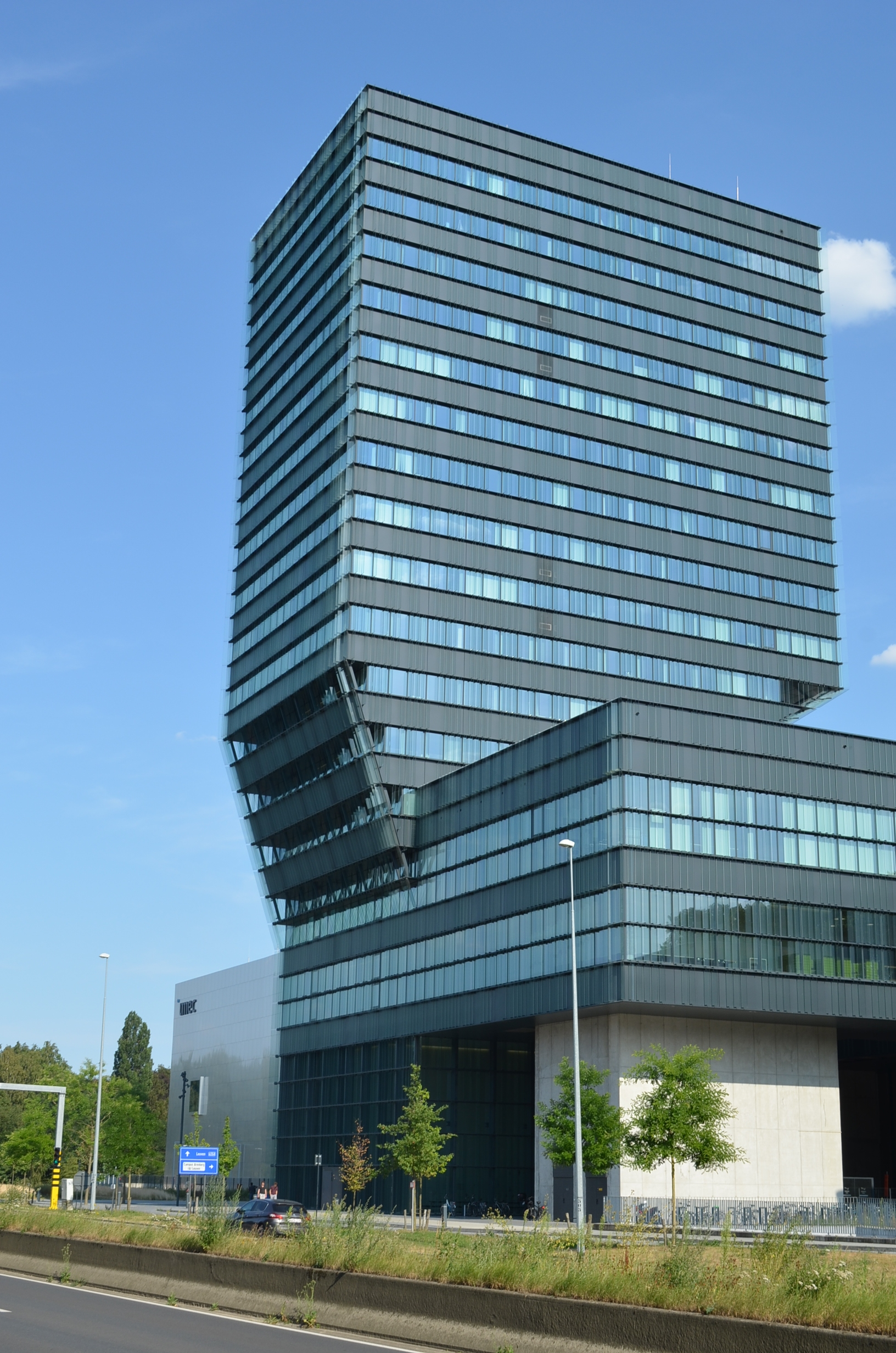
- IMEC Headquarters in Leuven, Belgium
- Type: Nonprofit company
- Industry: Nanoelectronics, digital technologies
- Genre: Independent research center
- Founded: 1984; 42 years ago
- Founder: Roger Van Overstraeten
- Headquarters: Leuven, Belgium
- Number of locations: Belgium (5), Netherlands (3), United States (6), Taiwan (1), Japan (1), United Kingdom (1), Germany (1), Spain (1), Italy (1) and India (1)
- Key people: Luc Van den hove (President and CEO)
- Services: R&D, business incubation, IP licensing, prototyping, training
- Revenue: 846 million Euro (2022)
- Number of employees: >5,000
- Website: www.imec-int.com

Interuniversity Microelectronics Centre (IMEC; officially stylised as imec) is an international research & development organization, active in the fields of nanoelectronics and digital technologies with headquarters in Leuven, Belgium. Luc Van den hove has served as president and CEO since 2009.

IMEC has more than 5,500 employees and researchers for advanced semiconductor R&D activities, also including system scaling, silicon photonics, artificial intelligence, beyond 5G communications and sensing technologies. In 2022, IMEC's revenue (P&L) totaled 846 million euro.

== Overview ==
IMEC employs more than 5,500 researchers from more than 90 countries; it has numerous facilities dedicated to research and development around the world, including 12,000 square meters of cleanroom capacity for semiconductor processing. The IMEC headquarters are located in Leuven.

=== History ===
In 1982, the Flemish Government set up a program to strengthen the microelectronics industry in Flanders. This program included setting up a laboratory for advanced research in microelectronics (imec), a semiconductor foundry (former Alcatel Microelectronics, now STMicroelectronics and AMI Semiconductor,) and a training program for VLSI design engineers. The latter is now fully integrated in the IMEC activities.

IMEC was founded in 1984 as a non-profit organization led by Prof. Roger Baron Van Overstraeten. The name IMEC is an acronym of the original full name: Interuniversitair Micro-Electronica Centrum VZW. It is supervised by a board of directors, which includes delegates from industry, Flemish universities and the Flemish Government. Since 1984, IMEC has been led by Roger Van Overstraeten, Gilbert Declerck (as of June 1999), and Luc Van den Hove (as of July 2009).

In 2015, IMEC created a joint venture with Huawei and Semiconductor Manufacturing International Corporation (SMIC).

In February 2016, it was announced that IMEC would be merging with the Flemish digital research center, iMinds. The merge was finalized on September 21, 2016.

In January 2024, it was announced that IMEC would open a centre of R&D in the Andalusia Technology Park in Málaga, Spain.

In March 2024, the Flemish Government stated that IMEC would "drastically reduce" its partnerships with China due to export control concerns.

=== Advanced semiconductor scaling ===
IMEC is well known for its expertise in shrinking circuitry and the applicability of nanotechnology in novel industries. In 2015, The New York Times stated that IMEC had helped pioneer techniques to produce some of the world's smallest and most sophisticated chips and the centre was considered to be a world-leader in nanoelectronics research.

In December 2022, IMEC signed a cooperation agreement with the new Japanese venture Rapidus for the production of 2 nm process semiconductor chips.

=== Energy ===
IMEC performs research in smart energy, ranging from developing ways to actively and cost-effectively plan, deploy, and manage smart grid networks up to improving the efficiency, production and storage cost of (solar) energy. Considerable advances have been made in solar cell and solid state battery technologies.

Together with KU Leuven, VITO, and UHasselt, IMEC set up a separate R&D hub to perform research into sustainable energy and intelligent energy systems. The project is named EnergyVille and employs 400 researchers whose work centers around six interdisciplinary domains: photovoltaics, electrical and thermal storage, power control and conversion, electrical and thermal networks, buildings and districts, strategies and markets.

=== Artificial intelligence ===
IMEC performs advanced research on artificial intelligence and was awarded US$750,000 twice in 2019 by DARPA in a machine-learning competition.

In a 2017 report, The Financial Times named IMEC's self-learning neuromorphic chip one of the fifty ideas that will change the world and was described by the newspaper as having the potential to revolutionize computing.

=== Smart cities ===
In 2017, the Flemish government commissioned IMEC to support the 13 leading Flemish cities and the Flemish community in Brussels in their transition to becoming smart cities. IMEC was also commissioned by the Flemish government and the City of Antwerp to create Europe's largest lab for Internet of Things applications.

=== Image sensors and vision systems ===
In 2019, the state of Florida declared a partnership with IMEC to develop hyperspectral technology that is able to better detect invasive Burmese and rock pythons, which have been permanently damaging the Everglades' eco-systems.

=== Smart health ===
==== Neuropixels technology ====
The performance of the Neuropixels probes and their potential for transformational neuroscience experiments was described in a November 9, 2017 paper published in Nature. In 2019, The New York Times reported that IMEC's Neuropixels technology is widely recognized as the most advanced method of gathering data from brain cells.

==== Brain-On-Chip research ====
In 2018, IMEC announced the creation of a research venture together with KU Leuven, UZ Leuven and VIB, called Mission Lucidity. The venture’s aim is to decode dementia. IMEC is creating human-specific living brain models, so called 'brains-on-chips’ which automate and miniaturize human stem cell manipulations, and developing technology to generate programmable, instrumented 3D brain models with single-cell precision. The project was supported by a Collaborative Science Award of one million dollars by the Chan Zuckerberg Initiative.

==== Point of care blood test devices (Johns Hopkins University & miDiagnostics) ====
Peter Peumans, in charge of IMEC's life science technologies program, helped found miDiagnostics and was appointed CTO. In 2019, NASA awarded funding to miDiagnostics to test a technology for monitoring astronauts’ health status under zero gravity conditions, with the aim of advancing space health diagnostics.

==== Wearables ====
IMEC develops wearable devices. Its technologies have gained several approvals by regulatory agencies such as the FDA and PMDA and have made contributions to at least one published study.

Through its spinoff Bloomlife, IMEC develops pregnancy monitoring technology that tracks fetal health and fetal mobility, with the aim of giving pregnant women and their doctors better access to key details about fetal development.

Other applications include ingestible gut sensors designed to capture mechanical, electrical, and chemical changes that occur during digestion, flagging abnormalities and problems while also delivering personalized nutrition advice.

==== Breathalyzer ====
In 2020, IMEC started a large research project on the development of a breathalyzer to detect COVID-19 in exhaled breath. The basic idea was to use a silicon-based sieve to catch extremely small exhaled air particles from the deep lungs and by doing so, already detect the virus in an early stage of the infection.

== IMEC Malaga ==
The Spanish Prime Minister announced in mid-October 2024 that the first 100 million euros had been allocated "for the design and implementation of the scientific infrastructure operated by IMEC" in Málaga. This Andalusian city has positioned itself in recent years as the Spanish Hub of reference in the fields of technology, analytics and artificial intelligence.
