= Sonja Hofer =

German neuroscientist

Sonja Hofer (born 1977) is a German neuroscientist studying the neural basis of sensory perception and sensory-guided decision-making at the Sainsbury Wellcome Centre for Neural Circuits and Behaviour. Her research focuses on how the brain processes visual information, how neural networks are shaped by experience and learning, and how they integrate visual signals with other information in order to interpret the outside world and guide behaviour. She received her undergraduate degree from the Technical University of Munich, her PhD at the Max Planck Institute of Neurobiology in Martinsried, Germany, and completed a post doctorate at the University College London. After holding an Assistant Professorship at the Biozentrum University of Basel in Switzerland for five years, she now is a group leader and Professor at the Sainsbury Wellcome Centre for Neural Circuits and Behaviour since 2018.

== Early life ==
Hofer was born in 1977 in Taufkirchen, close to Munich, Germany. She received her primary education at a local Gymnasium.

== Education ==
=== Undergraduate school ===
Hofer began her undergraduate career in Munich at the Technical University studying biology with a specialization in zoology. During her undergraduate studies, Hofer worked with Starlings, studying their auditory system. By recording action potentials from neurons in their brains, she studied how the brain distinguishes signals from background noise.

=== Graduate studies ===
During her PhD at Max Planck Institute of Neurobiology, Martinsried, Germany, Hofer researched visual processing and plasticity in the primary visual cortex of mice. There she worked on monocular deprivation and used mice as a model for plasticity in cortical circuits. Hofer used dendritic spine imaging and two photon laser scanning microscopy. Her work demonstrated plasticity in the neocortical circuits of adult mice. Specifically, she showed that sensory experiences made early in life leave a synaptic trace in the neocortex that allows for faster adaptation of cortical circuits when the same experience is made again.

=== Postdoctoral studies ===
Hofer completed her post-doctorate at the University College London from 2006 to 2012. She developed a novel technique that combined in vivo two-photon calcium imaging with in vitro whole-cell recordings to study the same set of cells in vitro and in vivo. Her findings supported clear functional organization within the subnetworks in the visual cortex. With this technique she investigated how neurons in the cerebral cortex communicate with each other and found that connections between excitatory neurons in neocortex are highly structured, forming functionally specific subnetworks.

== Career and research ==
Hofer's lab currently studies circuit mechanisms of sensory processing and sensory-guided decision-making. Research from the Hofer lab investigated what information about the visual scene individual neurons in visual cortex receive, and how learning changes neural responses to visual stimuli in primary visual cortex (V1) during acquisition of a visually-guided behavioral task. More recently, the Hofer lab investigated how sensory and non-sensory information is integrated by subcortical structures to guide behaviour. They found that the ventral lateral geniculate nucleus (vLGN), an inhibitory prethalamic area, is a critical hub for the control of visually-evoked fear responses depending on an animal's prior knowledge and internal state.

== Awards ==
- Eric Kandel Young Neuroscientists Prize, presented on 27 September 2013
- ERC Starting Grant 2013
- Wellcome Trust Research Career Development Fellowship and Wellcome-Beit Prize
- Otto-Hahn Medal (awarded by the Max Planck Society)
