= Neurometric function =

Neuroscience concept

In neuroscience, a neurometric function is a mathematical formula relating the activity of brain cells to aspects of an animal's sensory experience or motor behavior. Neurometric functions provide a quantitative summary of the neural code of a particular brain region.

In sensory neuroscience, neurometric functions measure the probability with which a sensory stimulus would be perceived based on decoding the activity of a given neuron or collection of neurons.

The concept was introduced to investigate the visibility of visual stimuli, by applying Detection theory to the output of single neurons of visual cortex.

Comparing neurometric functions to psychometric functions (by recording from neurons in the brain of the observer) can reveal whether the neural representation in the recorded region constrains perceptual accuracy.

In motor neuroscience, neurometric functions are used to predict body movements from the activity of neuronal populations in regions such as motor cortex. Such neurometric functions are used in the design of brain–computer interfaces.

== See also ==
- Psychometric function
- Psychometrics
