= Zoe Kourtzi =

Greek professor

Zoe Kourtzi is Professor of Experimental Psychology at the University of Cambridge. She is the Scientific Director of Early Detection of Neurodegenerative Diseases (EDoN), a project involving an international team supported by Alzheimer's Research UK, researching mechanisms for learning and plasticity in dementia patients.

== Early career ==
Kourtzi obtained her degree in Experimental Psychology from the University of Crete and a PhD from Rutgers University in the United States. She was a researcher at MIT and Harvard University. In 1999 she was awarded a McDonnell-Pew Fellowship that enabled her to work at the Max Planck Institute for Biological Cybernetics in Tübingen, Germany. She became Professor of Brain Imaging at the University of Birmingham in 2005.

== EDoN ==
The aim of Kourtzi's current project is to derive individualised prognostic scores of cognitive decline. In collaboration with Addenbrooke's Hospital, they seek to use AI to predict dementia earlier and enable better outcomes. The project involves the collection of data from wearable technology to predict diseases like Alzheimer's.
