= Gatsby Charitable Foundation =

Grant-making trust in London

The Gatsby Charitable Foundation is an endowed grant-making trust based in London, founded by David Sainsbury in 1967. The organisation is one of the Sainsbury Family Charitable Trusts set up to provide funding for charitable causes. Although the organisation is permitted in its Trust Deed to make general grants within this broad area, its activities have been restricted to a limited number of fields. According to the OECD, the Gatsby Charitable Foundation's financing for 2019 development increased by 40% to US$18.9 million.

Amongst its activities, the Gatsby Charitable Foundation funds the Gatsby Computational Neuroscience Unit and Sainsbury Wellcome Centre for Neural Circuits and Behaviour at University College London, the Sainsbury Management Fellowships, the Institute for Government based in Carlton House Terrace, and the Sainsbury Laboratory. It funded the Centre for Mental Health until 2010. The foundation is a co-sponsor of the University Technical Colleges programme, in conjunction with the Baker Dearing Trust.
