= Ihor Huk (surgeon) =

Ukrainian doctor and surgeon based in Vienna

Ihor Huk (Ukrainian: І́гор Гук) is a Ukrainian vascular surgeon, transplant surgeon, and researcher based in Vienna, Austria known for his research on biological functions of nitric oxide and on the vascular system. Huk studied medicine in Gdansk (1969–1975) and then specialised in vascular surgery at the University of Vienna.

== Career ==
Huk is the former Director of Experimental Vascular Laboratory for the Department of Surgery at the Medical University Vienna since 1994, the Chairman of the Division of Vascular Surgery since 2013. Huk is a foreign member of the National Academy of Sciences of Ukraine.

Huk studied the issues of diagnosis and complications regarding the surgical treatment of aortic ischemia, the effect of nitric oxide on the vascular wall, reperfusion injury of organs, and the impact of amino acids on healthy cell development.

Huk has completed more than 50,000 surgeries, including abdominal, vascular and transplantations, and over 1,000 kidney, liver and arteries transplants throughout his career. Huk's primary practice is at the Vienna General Hospital (VGH) and has also worked as a Chief Physician at the Wiener Privatklinik (WPK) for over 30 years, where his focus on vascular surgery includes operations on carotid arteries to prevent strokes, aneurysm operations, and surgery on arteries threatened with occlusion or rupture, as well as reconstructive surgery on vessels (bypass, shunt and stent). Huk has authored or co-authored more than 40 papers in journals.

== Personal life ==
Huk is part of a group of Ukrainian scientists, journalists, and other public figures that has published an open letter to Ukrainian president Volodymyr Zelenskyy in support of freedom of speech in Ukraine in 2020.

In 2016, daily German-language Austrian newspaper Kurier reported on a violent robbery at Huk's Vienna home where his wife suffered facial injuries. Huk shared how he stayed calm and made a psychological connection with the robber to defuse the situation, and how he performed a surgery the next day.

Huk successfully performed stent surgery on the Patriarch Filaret in Vienna in 2015.

== Honours and memberships ==
Huk is an ambassador at large for the private Zürich-based International Human Rights Commission. He is an honorary professor of Ternopil State Medical University in Ukraine. He is a member of several professional organizations including, the Austrian Society of Surgery and the Austrian Society of Angiology. Huk is on the editorial board for the Ukrainian scientific journal Modern Medical Technologies. He is also an advisor to the President of the European Commission.
