= Neuropixels =

Electrodes to record the activity of hundreds of neurons in the brain

Neuropixels probes (or "Neuropixels") are electrodes developed in 2017 to record the activity of hundreds of neurons in the brain. The probes are based on CMOS technology; the original versions have 960 recording sites arranged in two rows on a thin, 1-cm long shank.

The probes are used in hundreds of neuroscience laboratories including the International Brain Laboratory, to record brain activity mostly in mice and rats. By revealing the activity of vast numbers of neurons, Neuropixels probes are allowing new approaches to the study of brain processes such as sensory processing, decision making, internal state, and emotions and to create brain-machine interfaces.

== History ==
The probes were first announced in 2017. They were developed by a consortium of IMEC, the Janelia Research Campus of HHMI, the Allen Institute for Brain Science, and University College London. Funding was provided by the Howard Hughes Medical Institute (HHMI), the Wellcome Trust, the Gatsby Charitable Foundation and the Allen Institute for Brain Science. They are fabricated by IMEC, an electronics research center in Belgium.

In 2021 a new and improved version, NeuroPixels 2.0, was announced. In 2025, a new version that also includes dual-color optogenetic simulation was introduced.

Neuropixels was originally developed only for use in experimental animals, but by 2022, Neuropixels probes were inserted in human patients.

== Data ==
Each pixel of the NeuroPixels probe records the extra-cellular voltage present at that spot of the brain. In general this is composed of two components - the local field potential, which is a slowly varying signal that is a sum of activity in the region, and the action potentials, which are short, fast transients, largely from neurons that are very close to the electrode. Neuropixels breaks these into two bands for processing, as the 10-bit resolution of the A/D converters cannot cover both cases simultaneously. The LFP band is 0.5-1000 Hz and sampled at 2.5 KHz, and the AP band is 0.3-10 KHz and sampled at 30 KHz.

== Data processing ==
Each individual pixel receives contributions from many neurons, and conversely a single neuron can contribute to many pixels. Untangling these contributions, to compute the activity of particular neurons, requires a process known as spike sorting. This is computationally expensive, and needed new development to be practical with the large number of channels enabled by NeuroPixels. This development is on-going as new versions of Neuropixels continue to increase the amount of data that can be collected.

== Uses ==
Among many other uses, researchers have used multiple Neuropixels probes in the same animal to conduct surveys of spiking activity from tens of thousands of neurons simultaneously, in six cortical and two thalamic regions of the brain. The data from this survey is openly available.
