= Visual neuroscience =

Visual neuroscience is a branch of neuroscience concerned with how the visual system, including the retina and visual pathways in the brain, processes visual information. The main goal of visual neuroscience is to understand how neural activity results in visual perception, as well as behaviors dependent on vision. In the past, visual neuroscience has focused primarily on how the brain (and in particular the visual cortex) responds to light rays projected from static images and onto the retina. While this provides a reasonable explanation for the visual perception of a static image, it does not provide an accurate explanation for how we perceive the world as it really is, an ever-changing, and ever-moving 3-D environment. The topics summarized below are representative of this area, but are not exhaustive.

== Face processing ==
A study using Event-Related Potentials (ERPs) linked an increased neural activity in the occipito-temporal region of the brain to the visual categorization of facial expressions. Results focus on a negative peak in the ERP that occurs 170 milliseconds after the stimulus onset. The N170 is a component of the event-related potential (ERP) associated with face processing and is typically recorded over occipitotemporal scalp regions. Studying by using the EEG, and ERP methods allow for an extremely high temporal resolution of 4 milliseconds, which makes these kinds of experiments extremely well suited for accurately estimating and comparing the time it takes the brain to perform a certain function. Scientists used classification image techniques, to determine what parts of complex visual stimuli (such as a face) will be relied on when patients are asked to assign them to a category, or emotion. They computed the important features when the stimulus face exhibited one of five different emotions. Stimulus faces exhibiting fear had the distinguishing feature of widening eyes, and stimuli exhibiting happiness exhibited a change in the mouth to make a smile. Regardless of the expression of the stimuli's face, the region near the eyes affected the EEG before the regions near the mouth. This revealed a sequential, and predetermined order to the perception and processing of faces, with the eye being the first, and the mouth, and nose being processed after. This process of downward integration only occurred when the inferior facial features were crucial to the categorization of the stimuli. This may be explained by comparing what happens when participants were shown a face exhibiting fear, versus happiness. The N170 peaked slightly earlier for the fear stimuli at about 175 milliseconds, meaning that it took a participants less time to recognize the facial expression. This was expected because only the eyes need to be processed to recognize the emotion. However, when processing a happy expression, where the mouth is crucial to categorization, downward integration must take place, and thus the N170 peak occurred later at around 185 milliseconds. Eventually visual neuroscience aims to explain how the visual system processes all changes in faces as well as objects, to provide a complete view on how the world is constantly visually perceived, and may provide insight into a link between perception and consciousness.

== Perceptions of light and shadows ==
Scientists have conducted experiments challenging the hierarchal process of visual perception of lightness. These experiments have suggested that the perception of lightness is derived from a much higher level of cognition involving the interpretation of illuminations and shadows rather than the process occurring at a basic single unit level. This idea is best explained by examining two different versions of two common visual illustrations. The first set of illustrations cause a phenomenon known as the induction effect. The image consists of two identical gray squares, surrounded by black and white respectively. The result is that the perception of the gray on the white is darker than the gray on the black. The traditional way of explaining this is through lateral inhibition. A cell with a receptive field in the gray square surrounded by the white receives more of the lateral inhibition and thus it does not fire as often and appears darker. The second set of illustrations explain the Craik-O'Brien-Cornsweet illusion. This includes a sharp transition from black to white in the middle then fading to medium gray on the other side. The other two diagrams exhibit the same two effects but with a much greater intensity. This is due to the shapes in the illustrations being 3-dimensional causing the human mind to interpret the seemingly darker areas as shadows. This was first introduced by Ernst Mach in 1866.

== Visual neuroscience and clinical neuropsychology ==
Research into visual neuroscience contributes to knowledge of the human visual system, aiming to fill in many of the steps between the moment when light hits our retina to when we experience visual perception of our world. Insight into this process could allow clinical psychologists to gain a greater understanding for what may be causing visual disorders in their patients. Understanding the underlying process of a visual disorder will not necessarily lead identifying better treatment options, but being able to explain a disorder from a scientific perspective may help put patient and the clinician at ease.
