= Systems neuroscience =

Subdiscipline of neuroscience and systems biology

Spatial scale of nervous systems. (A) Nervous systems span many spatial scales, from molecules at the sub-micron level to whole-brain networks that span centimeters or more. (B) Each level of the nervous system requires distinct imaging and recording modalities to measure its relevant neural activity, presenting challenges to integration across modalities.

Systems neuroscience is a subdiscipline of neuroscience and systems biology that studies the structure and function of various neural circuits and systems that make up the central nervous system of an organism. Systems neuroscience encompasses a number of areas of study concerned with how nerve cells behave when connected together to form neural pathways, neural circuits, and larger brain networks. At this level of analysis, neuroscientists study how different neural circuits work together to analyze sensory information, form perceptions of the external world, form emotions, make decisions, and execute movements.

Researchers in systems neuroscience are concerned with the relation between molecular and cellular approaches to understanding brain structure and function, as well as with the study of high-level mental functions such as language, memory, and self-awareness (which are the purview of behavioral and cognitive neuroscience). To deepen their understanding of these relations and functions, systems neuroscientists typically employ techniques for understanding networks of neurons as they are seen to function, by way of electrophysiology using either single-unit recording or multi-electrode recording, functional magnetic resonance imaging (fMRI), and PET scans.

The term is commonly used in an educational framework: a common sequence of graduate school neuroscience courses consists of cellular/molecular neuroscience for the first semester, then systems neuroscience for the second semester. It is also sometimes used to distinguish a subdivision within a neuroscience department in a university.

== Major branches ==
Systems neuroscience has three major branches in relation to measuring the brain: behavioral neuroscience, computational modeling, and brain activity. Through these three branches, it breaks down the core concepts of systems neuroscience and provides valuable information about how the functional systems of an organism interact independently and intertwined with one another.

=== Behavioral neuroscience ===
Behavioral neuroscience in relation to systems neuroscience focuses on representational dissimilarity matrices (RDMs), which categorizes brain activity patterns and compares them across different conditions, such as the dissimilar level of brain activity observing an animal in comparison to an inanimate object. These models give a quantitative representation of behavior while providing comparable models of the patterns observed.^{5} Correlations or anticorrelations between brain-activity patterns are used during experimental conditions to distinguish the processing of each brain region when stimuli is presented.

=== Computational modeling ===
Computational models provide a base form of brain-activity level, which is typically represented by the firing of a single neuron. This is essential for understanding systems neuroscience as it shows the physical changes that occur during functional changes in an organism. While these models are important for understanding brain-activity, one-to-one correspondence of neuron firing has not been completely uncovered yet. Different measurements of the same activity lead to different patterns, when in theory, the patterns should be the same, or at least similar to one another. However, studies show fundamental differences when it comes to measuring the brain, and science strives to investigate this dissimilarity.

=== Brain activity ===
Brain activity and brain imaging help scientists understand the differences between functional systems of an organism in combination with computational models and the understanding of behavioral neuroscience. The three major branches of systems neuroscience work together to provide the most accurate information about brain activity as neuroimaging allows in its current state. While there can always be improvements to brain-activity measurements, typical imaging studies through electrophysiology can already provide massive amounts of information about the systems of an organism and how they may work intertwined with one another. For example, using the core branches of systems neuroscience, scientists have been able to dissect a migraine’s attack on the nervous system by observing brain-activity dissimilarities and using computational modeling to compare the differences of a functioning brain and a brain affected by a migraine.^{6}

== Observations ==
Systems neuroscience is observed through electrophysiology, which focuses on the electrical activity of biological systems in an organism. Through electrophysiology studies, the activity levels of different systems in the body help explain abnormalities of systematic functioning, such as an abnormal heartbeat rhythm or a stroke. While the main focus of electrophysiology is the heart, it does provide informational scanning of brain activity in relation to other bodily functions, which can be useful for the connection of neurological activity between systems.

Although systems neuroscience is generally observed in relation to a human’s level of functioning, many studies have been conducted on drosophila, or the small fruit fly, as it is considered to be easier due to the simpler brain structure and more controllable genetic and environmental factors from an experimental standpoint. While there are strong dissimilarities between the functioning capabilities of a fruit fly in comparison to a human, these studies still provide valuable insight on how a human brain might work.

Neural circuits and neuron firing is more easily observable in fruit flies through functional brain imaging, as neuronal pathways are simplified and, therefore, are easier to follow. These pathways may be simple, but by understanding the basis of neuron firing, this can lead to important studies on a human’s neuronal pathway and eventually to a one-to-one neuron correspondence when a system is functioning.^{7}

== See also ==
Example systems

- Ascending reticular activating system
- Auditory system
- Gustatory system
- Motor system
- Olfactory system
- Reward system
- Sensory system
- Somatosensory system
- Visual system

Related concepts

- Sensory neuroscience
- Neural oscillation
- Neural correlate
- Neural substrate
- Behavioral neuroscience
- Neuroimaging
- Electrophysiology
