= Unstable DNA sequence =

Changeable segments of genetic material

Unstable DNA sequence are segments of genetic material that exhibit high rates of mutation or variation over time, resulting in significant genetic diversity within populations or even individual organisms.

Such sequences are found in various regions of the genome, including both coding and non-coding regions. They are characterized by their propensity to change through mechanisms such as trinucleotide repeat expansion, slipped strand mispairing, or unequal crossing over during meiosis. Instability in such sequences is found to have a causative association with a wide variety of genetic disorders, making it an important area of investigation in genetics and molecular biology. The instability of DNA is also harnessed in scientific research and forensic science, particularly in the form of variable number tandem repeats (VNTRs) and short tandem repeats (STRs) analysis, which are used for DNA profiling and studying genetic relatedness.

== Types of unstable DNA sequences ==
=== Microsatellites ===
Microsatellites, also known as simple sequence repeats (SSRs), consist of short, repeated sequences of DNA. These sequences are prone to expansions or contractions in the number of repeats, leading to genomic instability. Studies in Saccharomyces cerevisiae (baker's yeast) have revealed that poly(GT) and poly(G) tracts, which are common forms of SSRs, show dramatic alterations in length due to the instability of these sequences. Such changes often involve one or two repeat unit additions or deletions and can interact with telomeres, affecting chromosomal stability.

=== Trinucleotide repeat sequences ===
TRSs are a subset of microsatellites. Expansion of trinucleotide repeats beyond a certain threshold can lead to a range of genetic disorders, such as fragile X syndrome and Huntington's disease.

=== Minisatellites ===
Minisatellites, also known as variable number tandem repeats (VNTRs), are specific regions of DNA characterized by the presence of short repeating units, typically ranging in length from 6 to 100 base pairs.

Minisatellites are often found in non-coding regions of the genome, meaning they do not typically contain instructions for protein synthesis. They are scattered throughout the genome and can be present in both coding and non-coding DNA regions. Due to their high variability between individuals, they have been utilized in DNA fingerprinting.

=== Inverted repeats ===
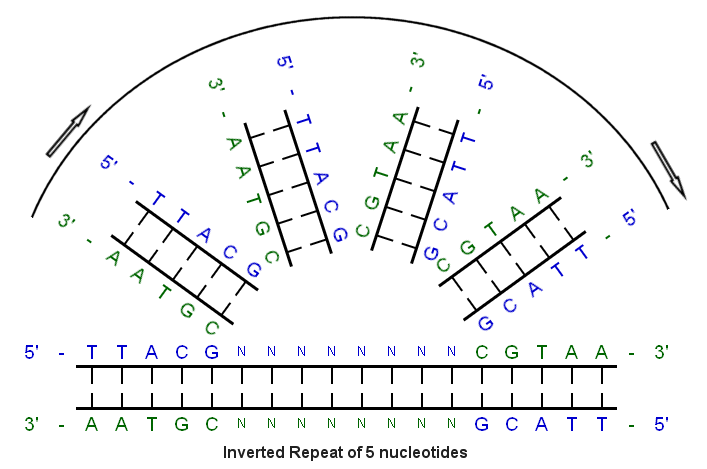
A schematic showing an example of an inverted repeat sequence involving the repeat of 5 nucleotides (5'-TTACG-3')

Inverted repeats are specific DNA sequences in which the nucleotide sequence on one strand is reversed and complementary to the sequence on the other strand.

Long inverted repeats within the genomes of various organisms exhibit substantial instability. This instability can manifest in both mitotic and germline cells, leading to mutations that range from small rearrangements to complete deletions of sequences. Such instability highlights the complex nature of genomic repeats and their susceptibility to mutations.

=== DNA duplication regions ===
Genomic regions prone to duplication can exhibit high levels of instability, as demonstrated by the mouse pink-eyed unstable mutation. This mutation, which affects coat colour, shows a high frequency of reversion due to a tandem duplication of genomic DNA at the p locus. The instability associated with DNA duplications underscores the dynamic nature of the genome and its impact on phenotypic variation.

== Causes of unstable DNA sequences ==
=== DNA replication slippage ===
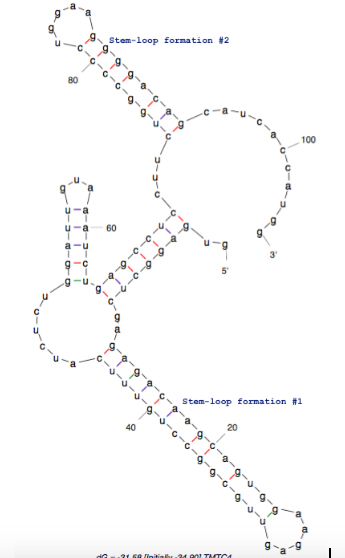
Image showing the formation of a DNA stem-loop (hairpin loop)

DNA replication slippage occurs when the replication machinery encounters a repetitive sequence, such as a trinucleotide repeat region. The repetitive nature of these sequences can present challenges during replication, as the template and newly synthesized strands can misalign. One type of replication slippage is known as "looping out" formation. When the replication machinery encounters a repeat sequence, it can cause the newly synthesized strand to slip and form a loop due to the misalignment of the complementary nucleotides.

=== DNA repair challenges ===
Repetitive sequences can pose challenges for DNA repair mechanisms. When DNA is damaged, repair processes are initiated to restore the integrity of the DNA molecule. However, repetitive sequences may hinder accurate repair. The repetitive nature of the sequence makes it difficult for the repair machinery to identify the correct template for repair, leading to errors.

=== DNA secondary structure formation ===
Repetitive sequences have the potential to form secondary structures within the DNA molecule, such as hairpin loops or slipped structures.

== Unstable DNA sequences in diseases ==
=== Cancer ===
DNA instability can result in the activation of oncogenes, genes that have the potential to cause a cell to become cancerous, or the inactivation of tumor suppressor genes, which normally prevent cell division from occurring too rapidly or uncontrollably. For instance, microsatellite instability, which affects the lengths of short tandem repeats within the genome, is a hallmark of certain types of colorectal cancer.

=== Neurological disorders ===
Unstable DNA repeat expansions have been identified as the cause of over 50 neurodevelopmental, neurodegenerative, and neuromuscular disorders. These include, but not limited to, fragile X syndrome (FXS), spinocerebellar ataxias (SCAs), Huntington's disease (HD), myotonic dystrophy type 1 and 2 (DM1&DM2), frontotemporal dementia (FTD), and amyotrophic lateral sclerosis (ALS).

Moreover, recent years have discovered that diseases such as neuronal intranuclear inclusion disease (NIID), oculopharyngeal myopathy with leukoencephalopathy 1 (OPML1), and familial adult myoclonic epilepsies (FAME 1–4, 6&7), are all associated with trinucleotide repeat expansions.

== Unstable DNA sequences in forensic science ==
Short Tandem Repeats (STRs) and Variable Number Tandem Repeats (VNTRs) are utilized as markers in forensic science. These molecular markers exploit the highly unstable and polymorphic regions among individual genomes, facilitating the analysis of biological samples in criminal investigations and essential for individual identification.

The utilization of STR and VNTR markers represents a leap forward in forensic science, allowing the sensitive and accurate analysis of biological evidence. These techniques have become foundational in the field, enabling the identification of individuals from even highly degraded or minimal biological samples.

== History ==
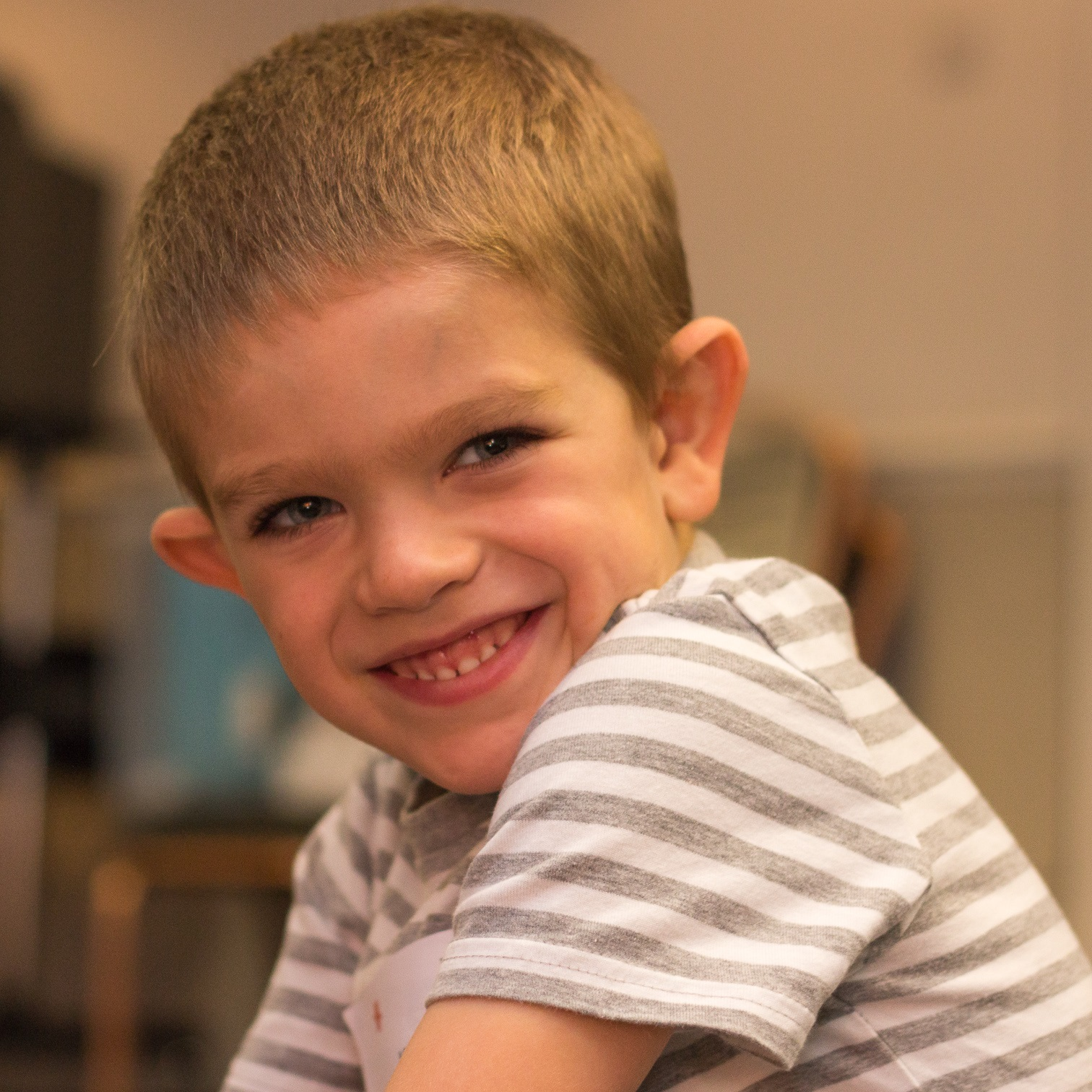
Image showing a child with fragile X syndrome

It took almost two centuries to establish the connection between unstable DNA sequences and the development of diseases. As early as the mid-1800s, there were records of anticipation in genetic disorders. However, many geneticists disregarded this phenomenon, considering it to be a result of biased observations.

=== Fragile X syndrome ===
In 1991, researchers studying fragile X syndrome found that the FMR1 gene has an unstable CGG trinucleotide repeat sequence in its promoter region. Individuals with this syndrome have an abnormal expansion of these CGG repeats, leading to the silencing of the FMR1 gene and inhibiting FMRP protein production. This results in global developmental delays, communication disorders, intellectual disabilities and learning problems.

Image showing the impacts of spinal and bulbar muscular atrophy (SBMA)

=== Spinal and bulbar muscular atrophy ===
Again, in 1991, scientists identified that individuals affected by SBMA have abnormal expansions of CAG repeats within the androgen receptor gene.

=== Unstable DNA repeats and other disorders ===
Following the discoveries in fragile X syndrome and SBMA, researchers began exploring other genetic disorders to determine if unstable DNA sequences played a role. This led to the identification of additional disorders caused by the repeats, including CTG expansion in myotonic dystrophy type 1 (1992), CCTG repeat expansion in myotonic dystrophy type 2, and CAG expansion in Huntington's disease (HD) (1993)

=== Repeat expansion mechanisms and disease pathogenesis ===
Scientists have since focused on understanding the mechanisms underlying repeat expansions and their impact on disease pathogenesis. Several theories regarding the cause of instability have emerged, including DNA replication slippage, DNA repair challenges, and DNA secondary structure formation
