= Dynamic mutation =

Unstable mutation in which phenotype severity is linked to copy number

In genetics, a dynamic mutation is an unstable heritable element where the probability of expression of a mutant phenotype is a function of the number of copies of the mutation. That is, the replication product (progeny) of a dynamic mutation has a different likelihood of mutation than its predecessor. These mutations, typically short sequences repeated many times, give rise to numerous known diseases, including the trinucleotide repeat disorders.

Robert I. Richards and Grant R. Sutherland called these phenomena, in the framework of dynamical genetics, dynamic mutations. Triplet expansion is caused by slippage during DNA replication. Due to the repetitive nature of the DNA sequence in these regions, 'loop-out' structures may form during DNA replication while maintaining complementary base pairing between the parent strand and daughter strand being synthesized. If the loop-out structure is formed from sequence on the daughter strand this will result in an increase in the number of repeats. However, if the loop-out structure is formed on the parent strand a decrease in the number of repeats occurs. It appears that expansion of these repeats is more common than reduction. Generally the larger the expansion the more likely they are to cause disease or increase the severity of disease. This property results in the characteristic of anticipation seen in trinucleotide repeat disorders. Anticipation describes the tendency of age of onset to decrease and severity of symptoms to increase through successive generations of an affected family due to the expansion of these repeats.

== Common features ==
- Most of these diseases have neurological symptoms.
- Anticipation/The Sherman paradox refers to progressively earlier or more severe expression of the disease in more recent generations.
- Repeats are usually polymorphic in copy number, with mitotic and meiotic instability.
- Copy number related to the severity and/or age of onset
- Imprinting effects
- Reverse mutation - The mutation can revert to normal or to a premutation carrier state.

== Examples ==
- Fragile X syndromes
- Huntington's disease
- Myotonic dystrophy
- Spinal and bulbar muscular atrophy
- Spinocerebellar ataxia type 3
- Friedreich ataxia
- Ocularpharyngeal muscular dystrophy
- Progressive myoclonus epilepsy
