= Macroorchidism =

Male genetic disorder in which the subject has abnormally large testicles

- Specialty: Urology

Macroorchidism is a disorder found in males, specifically in children, where a subject has abnormally large testes. The condition is commonly inherited in connection with fragile X syndrome (FXS), which is also the second most common genetic cause of intellectual disability. The condition is also a rare sign of McCune–Albright syndrome. The opposite of macroorchidism is called microorchidism, which is the condition of abnormally small testes.

Macroorchidism is related to IGFS1 deficiency, which causes an increase in the secretion of follicle stimulating hormone (FSH). There are other causes for macroorchidism, such as hypothyroidism, local tumors, and aromatase deficiency. Macroorchidism can be diagnosed by measuring the testicular volume using a prader orchidometer. There is no cure for macroorchidism; however, medications are currently being tested and used to control the disorder to promote quality living.

== Signs and symptoms ==
The most distinguishing physical symptom of macroorchidism in patients is increased testicular size. To determine the enlargement of testes (i.e., macroorchidism), the testes must be greater than the 95th percentile of the confidence interval in males after puberty. The 95th percentile means that a child's testicular size exceeds 95% of children similar in age. This rules out males with early puberty. Another symptom of macroorchidism is an increase in testicular volume that is at least twice the normal testicular volume for a child's age.

Macroorchidism is mostly found in prepubescent boys with fragile X syndrome. However, true macroorchidism does not start until the testicular size is greater than 4 mL, which can only occur later in the prepubertal period. Because macroorchidism is associated with fragile X syndrome patients, the signs in patients with FXS is similar in patients with macroorchidism. These signs include protruding ears, long face, bulging jaw and forehead, macrocephaly, mid-facial hypoplasia, and a high arched palate.

Even though FXS affects both males and females, the prevalence in males is approximately 1 in 4000 males, compared to 1 in 8000 for females.

== Cause ==
The cause of macroorchidism is still unclear. However, there are studies that show a connection between macroorchidism and other disorders related to hormones that reveal their possible role with abnormal enlargement of testes. An excessive increase in the interstitial volume and connective tissue of testes can lead to macroorchidism.

There are other causes of macroorchidism such as long-standing primary hypothyroidism, adrenal tissue remains in congenital adrenal hyperplasia (CAH), follicle-stimulating hormone (FSH) secreting pituitary macroadenomas, local tumors, lymphomas, and aromatase deficiency.

== Pathophysiology or mechanism ==
Macroorchidism results from an increased secretion of the follicle-stimulating hormone. The follicle-stimulating hormone is secreted without being affected by an increase in the secretion of the luteinizing hormone (LH) or a luteinizing hormone response to Gonadotropin-releasing hormone (GnRH).

Macroorchidism is related to a genetic defect in the Immunoglobulin Superfamily 1 (IGSF1) gene. However, not all patients with a failing IGSF1 gene present with macroorchidism. In gonadotropes, there is activin A. Gonadotropes are endocrine cells in the anterior pituitary that control and regulate reproduction. These cells release the FSH and LH hormones and play an important role in puberty. Activin A is a dimeric glycoprotein that is a member of the transforming growth factor-β (TGF-β) family. Activin A is responsible for hormonal homeostasis, gonadal functions, muscle growth, immunity, inflammation, and bone remodeling. Activin A binds to activin receptors (ActRs) in the gonadotropes and stimulates the Smad2 or Smad3 pathway to increase follicle-stimulating hormone beta subunit (FSHB). The follicle-stimulating hormone (FSH) then stimulates the follicle-stimulating hormone receptor (FSHR) of the sertoli cells, therefore producing inhibin B which brings into play a negative feedback over the pituitary FSHB expression. The IGSF1 gene inhibits the activin A pathway which decreases the rate of FSHB expression. IGSF1 gene deficiency leads to over-secretion of pituitary FSH causing an early and rapid increase in the testicular Sertoli cell mass (i.e. macroorchidism) in children and adults with FSH-secreting pituitary adenomas.

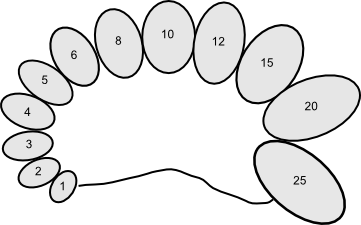
An orchidometer

== Diagnosis ==
Macroorchidism is usually found in prepubertal boys with long-standing primary hypothyroidism, boys with Van Wyk Grumbach Syndrome (VWGS), and boys with fragile X syndrome (FXS).

When macroorchidism is considered, the testicular volume is measured using a prader orchidometer. The prader orchidometer is used to quickly and accurately measure the testicular volume to evaluate male growth and development. The prader orchidometer is the most widely used orchidometer since 1966 and is calculated using the formula: Length*Width*Height*0.71. The correct final value from the calculation is compared with an age percentile table that shows how much a child exceeds the percentage of children his age for testicular volume.

Testicular volume changes throughout a male's life and is as follows:

- Childhood: 1 - 3 ml
- Early adolescence (puberty begins, 10 to 13 years): 4 - 6 ml
- Middle adolescence (puberty changes continue, 14 to 17 years): 8 - 10 ml
- Late adolescence/young adulthood (18 to 21 years and beyond): 12 - 15 ml
- Adulthood: 20 - 25 ml

People with macroorchidism have a testicular volume larger than 4 ml before puberty.

== Treatment or management ==
Treatment of macroorchidism depends on pathogenesis.

Surgical removal of the tumor is the most important and advised option for treating macroorchidism caused by non-functioning pituitary macroadenoma. A non-functioning pituitary adenoma is a kind of benign tumor that does not secrete active hormones, and is from the pituitary gland.

Macroorchidism caused by congenital adrenal hyperplasia (CAH) is treated using glucocorticoid. Using glucocorticoid at the beginning of macroorchidism can help reduce the abnormal testicular size. Glucocorticoid treatment is a dosage treatment in which glucocorticoids such as hydrocortisone, prednisolone, and dexamethasone are taken at various amounts and times of the day. Glucocorticoid treatment can help restore male fertility prohibited by macroorchidism. However, overusing glucocorticoid for long periods can lead to low semen quality.

Metformin is considered a long-term treatment of macroorchidism due to its relationship with FXS. Metformin lowers the excessive production of the proteins that cause abnormal testicular growth in people with FXS.

== Prognosis ==
Macroorchidism becomes more clear after puberty. Testicular size starts to increase normally from 8 to 9 years of age in boys. However, in patients with macroorchidism, around this time is when the testicles become abnormally and noticeably enlarged. Also, because macroorchidism is usually associated with intellectual disability, brainpower typically declines with age.

The life expectancy of patients with macroorchidism is normal. There is no cure for macroorchidism; however, there are medications tested in clinical trails identified to bring positive results.

== Epidemiology ==
Macroorchidism affects only males. The prevalence of macroorchidism is approximately 1 in 4000 males. Macroorchidism is present in more than 80-90% of postpubertal males with fragile X syndrome.

== Research direction ==
A research study was done in 2014 to learn if there is a relationship between macroorchidism and intellectual disability associated with decreased levels of Fragile X Messenger Ribonucleoprotein 1 gene protein (FMRP), but in the pre-mutation or carrier state. FMRP is made from the FMR1 gene and is mainly in the brain and testis. They used the analysis of covariance (ANCOVA) to compare the IQs of the macroorchidism patients with and without pre-mutation carriers. The results showed that there is a relationship between macroorchidism and intellectual disability in FMR1 pre-mutation carrier males. Further studies need to be done to determine if the correlation is due to higher or lower levels of FMR1 mRNA and FMRP respectively.

Another study done in 2018 researched the role of Immunoglobulin Superfamily 1 (IGSF1) serves in hypothyroidism and macroorchidism as a regulator of pituitary hormone secretion. A defect in the IGSF1 gene is one of the causes of macroorchidism. The results showed that IGSF1 is important for pituitary hormone regulation and that there are two important mechanisms of macroorchidism related to IGSF1 deficiency.
