= Bat ear =

Bat ear may refer to:

- Protruding ear, an abnormally protruding human ear
- A shape of dog ear; see Canine terminology
- The ear of a bat, used for echolocation
- The ear of a nocturnal insect, primarily used to detect calls from insectivorous bats

== See also ==
- Bat-eared fox
