= Sex differences in medicine =

Medical differences in humans by sex

Sex differences in medicine include sex-specific diseases or conditions which occur only in people of one sex due to underlying biological factors (for example, prostate cancer in males or uterine cancer in females); sex-related diseases, which are diseases that are more common to one sex (for example, breast cancer and systemic lupus erythematosus which occur predominantly in females); and diseases which occur at similar rates in males and females but manifest differently according to sex (for example, peripheral artery disease).

Sex differences should not be confused with gender differences. The US National Academy of Medicine recognizes sex differences as biological at the chromosomal and anatomical levels, whereas gender differences are based on self-representation and other factors including biology, environment and experience. That said, both biological and behavioural differences influence human health, and may do so differentially. Such factors can be inter-related and difficult to separate. Evidence-based approaches to sex and gender medicine try to examine the effects of both sex and gender as factors when dealing with medical conditions that may affect populations differently.

As of 2021, over 10,000 articles had been published addressing sex and gender differences in clinical medicine and related literature. Sex and gender affect cardiovascular, pulmonary and autoimmune systems, gastroenterology, hepatology, nephrology, endocrinology, haematology, neurology, pharmacokinetics, and pharmacodynamics.

Sexually transmitted infections, which have a significant probability of transmission through sexual contact, can be contracted by either sex. Their occurrence may reflect economic and social as well as biological factors, leading to sex differences in the transmission, prevalence, and disease burden of STIs.

Historically, medical research has primarily been conducted using the male body as the basis for clinical studies. The findings of these studies have often been applied across the sexes, and healthcare providers have traditionally assumed a uniform approach in treating both male and female patients. More recently, medical research has started to understand the importance of taking sex into account as evidence increases that the symptoms and responses to medical treatment may be very different between sexes.

== Background ==
Females and males exhibit many differences in terms of risk of developing disease, receiving an accurate diagnosis, and responding to treatments. A patient's sex has been increasingly recognized as one of the most important modulators of clinical decision making. Sex differences have been found across a broad range of disease areas, including many diseases which are sex-specific. The sex chromosome complement and sex hormone environment are known to be the primary constitutive difference between females and males. The imbalance of gene expression between the X and Y chromosomes is present within virtually all cells in the human body. Sex hormones are crucial in body development and function and also thought to contribute to sex differences in some diseases. It is suspected that many differences between the sexes are also influenced by social, environmental, and psychological factors which are difficult to tease apart from biological ones.

== Causes ==
Sex-related illnesses have various causes:

- Genetic sex differences start at conception depending on whether an ovum fuses with a sperm cell carrying an X or a Y chromosome. This leads to sex-based differences at the molecular level for all male and female cells.
- In males, the X chromosome carries only maternal imprints, while in females X chromosomes are present with both maternal and paternal imprints. In female cells, random processes of X-inactivation "turn off" the extra X chromosome. As a result, females, but not males, are mosaics. Female cells may express higher levels of some genes.
- Sex differences at the chromosome and molecular level exist in all human cells, and persist life-long, independent of sex hormones in the body.
- Depending on the bioavailability of sexual hormones such as androgens and estrogens and the respective derivates, males and females may have higher or reduced risks for diseases (see list below).
- Sex-linked genetic conditions that differ in males and females may reflect the effects of genetic damage on an X chromosome. In some cases, the presence of an "extra" X chromosome in female cells may lessen the impact of such damage. In severe cases, males may die during development and females may survive but display a sex-linked illness.
- The reproductive system develops differently for each sex. Sex-specific parts of the male and female reproductive systems affect the rest of the body and also can be affected differently by diseases.
- Socially constructed norms relate to gender roles, relationships, positional power, and a wide variety of behaviours. Norms affect people differentially depending on their sex and gender.
- Different levels of prevention, reporting, diagnosis, and treatment have been observed based on sex and gender.

== Examples of sex-related illnesses and disorders in humans ==
=== Females ===
Examples of sex-related illnesses and disorders in human females:

- 99% of breast cancer occurs in women.
- Ovarian cancer, endometriosis, (Note: Endometriosis very rarely affects men.) and other diseases affect the female reproductive system.
- Females are more likely to experience severe outcomes from viral respiratory tract infections during their reproductive years, compared to males of the same age. In response to treatment, females may develop greater immune responses but may also experience more adverse reactions than males.
- Approximately four times more women have osteoporosis than men.
- Autoimmune diseases, such as Sjögren's syndrome and scleroderma, are more prevalent in women. Roughly 70% of those living with autoimmune diseases are female. See Sex differences in autoimmunity.
- While estimates vary widely, eating disorders are estimated to affect as high as 13% of women in some age groups and 3% of men in Western cultures, with anorexia nervosa affecting 10 women for each man and bulimia nervosa affecting 8 women for each man.
- Alzheimer's disease has a higher incidence in females compared to males. There are also phenotypic differences, with females displaying more cognitive deficits. Females are also more likely to have neurofibrillary tangles present on autopsy.
- Huntington's disease affects females and males differently. Females have faster disease progression, and display symptoms with fewer trinucleotide repeats.
- About two times more women than men have unipolar clinical depression (although bipolar disorder appears to affect both sexes equally).
- About three times more women than men are diagnosed with borderline or histrionic personality disorder.
- Conditions such as chronic fatigue syndrome (CFS)/myalgic encephalomyelitis (ME), postural orthostatic tachycardia syndrome (POTS), fibromyalgia, irritable bowel syndrome (IBS) and idiopathic hypersomnia, which have unclear causes, are more common in women, with sex ratios ranging from 2:1 in IBS, fibromyalgia, and idiopathic hypersomnia to 4:1 in CFS, and 5:1 in POTS.
- Most people with psychogenic non-epileptic seizures (PNES) (75%) are female.
- Ataxic cerebral palsy is more common in women and girls.
- Turner Syndrome only occurs in females.

=== Males ===
Examples of sex-related illnesses and disorders in male humans:

- Prostate cancer, testicular cancer and other diseases of the male reproductive system occur in males.
- Diseases of X-linked recessive inheritance, such as colour blindness, occur more frequently in males, and haemophilia A and B occur almost exclusively in males.
- Males have a higher incidence of acute kidney injury and associated mortality compared to women. This is caused by a protection of females by estradiol and hydropersulfides, which can prevent ferroptosis.
- The presence of a single X chromosome in males (rather than two in females) may explain why males are more susceptible to genetic diseases linked to the X chromosome, including hemophilia, Duchenne muscular dystrophy, and Hunter syndrome.
- Certain neurodegenerative diseases (Parkinson's disease (2:1 ratio) and Lewy body dementia (4:1 ratio)) are more prevalent in males. Parkinson's also displays phenotypic differences: males are more likely to present with sleep disturbances and deficits in verbal fluency and facial expression.
- Abdominal aortic aneurysms are six times more common in males, and thus some countries have introduced screening for males at risk of developing the condition.
- Autism is approximately four times more prevalent in males than females. Males also have distinct autism phenotypes compared to females, including a higher prevalence of restrictive and repetitive behaviors.
- Males have increased risk of dyskinetic cerebral palsy and spastic diplegia, as well as lower limb deformities.
- Schizophrenia is about 1.4 times as common in males, and on average starts two years earlier and has more severe symptoms.
- More than two times more males than females are affected by antisocial personality disorder and substance use disorder.
- Several cancers, including stomach cancer (2:1), oesophageal cancer (3:1), liver cancer (2:1 to 4:1) and oral cancer (2:1 to 3:1), which have mostly lifestyle-based risk factors, are more common in males.
- Males are more likely to experience severe outcomes from viral respiratory tract infections than females, at younger and older ages.
- Tuberculosis is more common in males.
- In cases of preterm birth, being male is associated with higher mortality and morbidity in terms of respiratory distress, cardiovascular disorders (specifically hypotension), neurodevelopmental disorders, and immune disorders.
- Although both males and females can have eating disorders, males are less likely to be diagnosed and receive treatment.
- Klinefelter syndrome (karyotype XXY) is the most common sex chromosome aneuploidy (occurring in ~152/100,000 births, only in males). It is often subclinical, but can cause infertility, tall stature, gynecomastia (enlargement of the breast tissue), limited facial and body hair, and small firm testicles.

== Reasons for sex differences in incidence and prevalence ==
=== Hypertension ===
Hypertension is a worldwide disease affecting the sexes. Women are less frequently affected by high blood pressure . Since blood pressure rises in women after menopause, this suggests that the cause of the sex-specific differences lies not only in possible external factors, such as lifestyle, but also in the sex hormones . It is likely due to sex hormones not external factors. One possible mechanism is the influence of the renin-angiotensin system (RAAS).

Angiotensinogen (liver) is converted into angiotensin I (Ang I) by renin (kidney). Ang I is converted to angiotensin II (Ang II) by the angiotensin-converting enzyme (ACE). This binds to the Ang II type I receptor (A2T1), which causes vasoconstriction and water and sodium reabsorption in the kidneys, and in turn increases blood pressure.

Less well known is that Ang II can also bind to Ang II type II receptor (A2T2) or be converted by angiotensin-converting enzyme II (ACE II) into angiotensin III (Ang III), which binds to MAS receptors. Both A2T2 and MAS receptors trigger vasodilation.

Animal experiments have shown that female ovariectomised mice treated chronically with testosterone have increased blood pressure (mean arterial pressure ~180mmHg) compared to female mice from the control group (~155mmHg). This difference was reduced by ACE inhibition (enalapril (250 mg/L)) in both groups to a similar level ( ~115mmHg). It can therefore be assumed that male androgens have an increasing influence (up to 25mmHg in middle blood pressure) on angiotensinogen.

=== Autoimmune diseases (Sjögren's syndrome) ===
In autoimmune diseases, like Sjögren's syndrome (SS), the body produces hyperreactive autoantibodies against the salivary and lacrimal gland tissue. This results in symptoms like dry mouth and dry eyes.

The gender distribution in Sjögren's syndrome is heavily skewed towards women, with a ratio of 16:1 in the UK. Various reasons have been suggested, but the evidence is not strong. One common reason is the hormonal differences between women and men. In women, estrogen dominates, as does the hormone progesterone during pregnancy. Androgens (e.g. testosterone) are only present in small quantities. In men, testosterone, an androgen, dominates, and estrogen is only present to a small extent. Estrogen stimulates the immune system more than androgens. Accordingly, it stands to reason that an autoimmune reaction, which is based on a hyperreactive immune sensitivity to autoantigens, can manifest itself much more easily in women.

In Sjögren's syndrome, B cells and interferons are of particular importance. Generally, hormone receptors are expressed on immune cells (e.g., B cells), such as the estrogen receptor (ER-alpha/ß) or the androgen receptor. These receptors are steroid hormone receptors, i.e., they influence gene expression in the nucleus of the immune cells.

Pregnancy, including hormonal changes, appears to increase the risk of developing SS and also exacerbate the course of the disease if it is already present. During pregnancy, more hormones than just estrogen are secreted that also have an immune system-stimulating effect, such as prolactin. So, an overstimulated immune system seems to be the result.

On the other hand, estrogen protects glandular cells and prevents them from cell death. Menopause causes a decreased level of hormones like estrogen and thus reduces the protective effect on glandular cell health. Increased apoptosis (cell death) and inflammatory effects on damaged and aged cells are the result. As a result, there is an increased level of autoantibodies against the glandular cells. Estrogen is important, but only in the right amount. The study showed that the prevalence of women developing SS after menopause is quite higher than before menopause. This leads to the assumption that the protective effect of estrogen on glandular tissue is more important than the stimulation effect on B cells for the development of SS.

Another study investigated the hormonal influence on the pathogenesis of autoimmune diseases, including SS. Female mice had their ovaries removed to investigate the effect of missing estrogen on the pathogenesis of SS. In this study, low estrogen levels promoted apoptosis and the formation of apoptotic bodies and microparticles containing membrane antigens. These are recognized as pathogens via TLR (toll-like receptors) of the dendritic and B cells, which then secrete increased levels of INF alpha/ß and cytokines. These cytokines stimulate other immune cells (e.g., DC, T-cells), which can lead to autoreactivity and thus to an autoimmune reaction.

In men, the preliminary stage of testosterone, DHT (dihydrotestosterone), is synthesized from testosterone in one simple step. DHT has an anti-apoptotic effect on the glandular tissue. In women, DHEA (dehydroepiandrosterone) takes over this task. Synthesizing this product in women is much more complex and involves several steps that are difficult to ensure when estrogen levels are low (menopause, etc.). This might be another reason for increased apoptosis and the pathogenesis of SS in women compared to men.

Another key player in the pathogenesis of SS is INF1. It is stimulated by estrogen receptor interaction. INF1 ensures a higher level of autoantibodies and inflammatory cytokines. A study has shown that interferon type I and type II are more pronounced in women than in men. That might be a reason for the increased level of autoantibodies and prevalence of SS in women.

Androgens generally have stimulating effects on the production of the lipid layer in the tear film and oral mucosa. Androgens increase the level of integrins alpha1 and 2, which promote the differentiation of mesenchymal stem cells into acinar cells. In the absence of androgens, this differentiation and regulation are defective. In SS, the conversion of testosterone to DHT (in men) or DHEA (in women) in the lacrimal glands is defective. The enzymes are not functional. This means that the lipid layer, which is important for maintaining moisture in the mouth and on the eyes and providing protection against pathogens, is missing. This could be a leading reason for symptoms like dry mouth and dry eyes.

Another study investigated the effects of gene expression of the sex chromosomes. Normally, one X chromosome is inhibited in women (Barr body). However, not completely. Some of the genes of the inhibited X chromosome are still (single or double) expressed, including genes relevant to the immune system. This is supposed to ensure better immunity, among other things, but also results in a higher risk of autoimmunity.

The study has shown that the prevalence of SS in triple-X individuals is 2.9 times higher than in healthy women and 41 times higher than in healthy men, despite physiological hormone levels. This suggests an involvement of the double gene expression of the 2nd X chromosome in the pathogenesis of SS, which could also affect XX genotype women. An explanation how the double gene expression, which can also be normal, can be manifesting investigated another study.

Another study investigated the influence of a long non coding RNA protein, called XIST, which is a leading factor of the double X chromosome expression. XIST is only present in women where it is inactivating genes of the second "restoring" X chromosome. Dysfuncitonal XIST proteins seem to be a leading cause of higher prevalence of autoimmune diseases of women, so as in SS.

Furthermore, intestinal microbiome differences, elevated levels of certain miRNAs, and microchimerism during pregnancy are discussed and investigated as possible risk factors in the pathogenesis of SS.

== See also ==
- Andrology
- Gynaecology
- Health equity
- Men's health
- Obstetrics and gynecology
- Reproductive medicine
- Sex differences in humans
- Women's health
