= Small ball =

Small ball may refer to:

- Small ball (baseball), a strategy in baseball
- Small ball (basketball), a style of play in basketball involving smaller players
- Microorchidism, a genetic disorder characterized by small testicles
