= SBMA =

SBMA may refer to:

- Santa Barbara Museum of Art
- Spinal and bulbar muscular atrophy
- Subic Bay Metropolitan Authority
