= IGSF1 =

Protein-coding gene in the species Homo sapiens

Identifiers
- Aliases: IGSF1, CHTE, IGCD1, IGDC1, INHBP, PGSF2, p120, immunoglobulin superfamily member 1
- External IDs: OMIM: 300137; MGI: 2147913; GeneCards: IGSF1

Gene location (Human)
Chr.	X chromosome (human)
Band	Xq26.1	Start	131,273,506 bp
Band	Xq26.1	End	131,578,899 bp

Gene location (Mouse)
Chr.	X chromosome (mouse)
Band	X|X A5	Start	48,871,413 bp
Band	X|X A5	End	48,886,626 bp
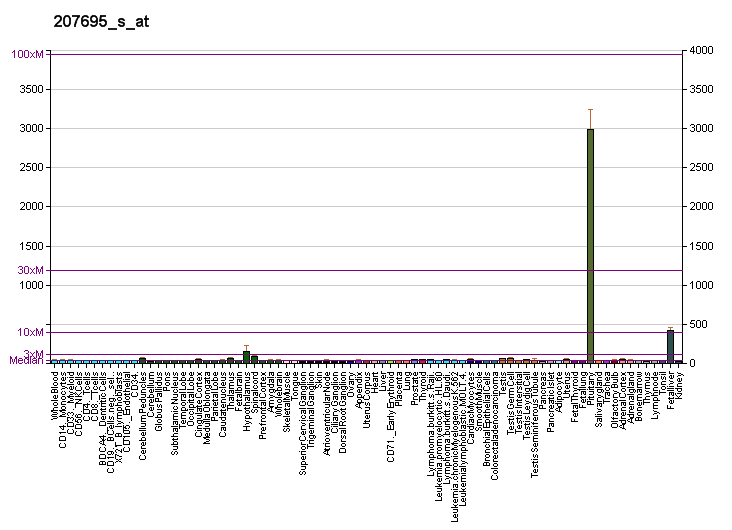
RNA expression pattern
Bgee	Human / Mouse (ortholog); Top expressed in: pituitary gland; anterior pituitary; right auricle of heart; hypothalamus; tibial nerve; nucleus accumbens; apex of heart; left testis; right testis; substantia nigra / Top expressed in: arcuate nucleus; median eminence; dorsomedial hypothalamic nucleus; ventromedial nucleus; suprachiasmatic nucleus; dorsal tegmental nucleus; mammillary body; lateral hypothalamus; lumbar subsegment of spinal cord; ventral tegmental area; More reference expression data
BioGPS	More reference expression data
Gene ontology
Molecular function	inhibin binding; protein binding; coreceptor activity; activin receptor antagonist activity
Cellular component	integral component of membrane; extracellular region; membrane
Biological process	regulation of transcription, DNA-templated; signal transduction; negative regulation of activin receptor signaling pathway
Sources:Amigo / QuickGO
Orthologs
Databases	NCBI: entry; OMA: entry
Species	Human	Mouse
Entrez	3547	209268
Ensembl	ENSG00000147255	ENSMUSG00000031111
UniProt	Q8N6C5	Q7TQA1
RefSeq (mRNA)	NM_001170961; NM_001170962; NM_001170963; NM_001555; NM_205833	NM_177591; NM_177915; NM_183335; NM_183336
RefSeq (protein)	NP_001164432; NP_001164433; NP_001164434; NP_001546; NP_991402	NP_808259; NP_808583; NP_899178; NP_899179
Location (UCSC)	Chr X: 131.27 – 131.58 Mb	Chr X: 48.87 – 48.89 Mb
PubMed search
- Wikidata
View/Edit Human	View/Edit Mouse

Immunoglobulin superfamily, member 1 is a plasma membrane glycoprotein encoded by the IGSF1 gene, which maps to the X chromosome in humans and other mammalian species.

== Function ==
IGSF1's function in normal cells is unresolved. The protein is a member of the immunoglobulin (Ig) superfamily. It was predicted to contain 12 Ig domains, a transmembrane domain, and a short cytoplasmic tail. However, during translation of the protein, it is cleaved into amino- and carboxy-terminal domains (NTD and CTD, respectively). Only the CTD is trafficked to the plasma membrane. The NTD is trapped within the endoplasmic reticulum (ER). Pathogenic mutations in the IGSF1 gene block the transport of the CTD to the plasma membrane.

== Clinical relevance ==
Mutations in IGSF1 cause a condition called IGSF1 deficiency syndrome or central hypothyroidism/testicular enlargement (CHTE). The condition, which affects an estimated 1:100,000 people, is more common in males than females. Most affected males are discovered through neonatal screening for hypothyroidism. The extent of hypothyroidism is variable, but most male cases require treatment with thyroid hormone replacement. Males with IGSF1 deficiency exhibit enlarged testicles (also known as macroorchidism) and a delay in the development of secondary sexual characteristics. Post-pubertally, there is no evidence of impaired fertility in these men.

The IGSF1 gene is also active in the brain and in the developing liver. It can also become reactivated in liver cancer (hepatocellular carcinoma).

== Animal model ==
Mice lacking a functional Igsf1 gene similarly exhibit hypothyroidism of central origin. The IGSF1 gene is particularly active in the pituitary gland. The pituitary synthesizes and secretes thyroid-stimulating hormone (TSH). TSH, in turn, stimulates production of the thyroid hormones, thyroxine and triiodothyronine, by the thyroid gland. TSH secretion is controlled by thyrotropin-releasing hormone (TRH), which is released by neurons in the hypothalamus of the brain. In Igsf1 deficient mice, the receptor for TRH is downregulated in the pituitary. This decrease could explain, at least in part, the central hypothyroidism observed in both humans and mice with IGSF1 deficiency. How the loss of IGSF1 causes a decrease in TRH receptors is presently unknown.
