= Slipped strand mispairing =

Nucleotide duplications created by DNA polymerase during DNA replication

Slipped strand mispairing (SSM, also known as replication slippage) is a mutation process which occurs during DNA replication. It involves denaturation and displacement of the DNA strands, resulting in mispairing of the complementary bases. Slipped strand mispairing is one explanation for the origin and evolution of repetitive DNA sequences.

It is a form of mutation that leads to either a trinucleotide or dinucleotide expansion, or sometimes contraction, during DNA replication. A slippage event normally occurs when a sequence of repetitive nucleotides (tandem repeats) are found at the site of replication. Tandem repeats are unstable regions of the genome where frequent insertions and deletions of nucleotides can take place, resulting in genome rearrangements. DNA polymerase, the main enzyme to catalyze the polymerization of free deoxyribonucleotides into a newly forming DNA strand, plays a significant role in the occurrence of this mutation. When DNA polymerase encounters a direct repeat, it can undergo a replication slippage.

Strand slippage may also occur during the DNA synthesis step of DNA repair processes. Within DNA trinucleotide repeat sequences, the repair of DNA damage by the processes of homologous recombination, non-homologous end joining, DNA mismatch repair or base excision repair may involve strand slippage mispairing leading to trinucleotide repeat expansion when the repair is completed.

Slipped strand mispairing has also been shown to function as a phase variation mechanism in certain bacteria.

== Stages ==
Slippage occurs through five main stages:

1. In the first step, DNA polymerase encounters the direct repeat during the replication process.
2. The polymerase complex suspends replication and is temporarily released from the template strand.
3. The newly synthesized strand then detaches from the template strand and pairs with another direct repeat upstream.
4. DNA polymerase reassembles its position on the template strand and resumes normal replication, but during the course of reassembling, the polymerase complex backtracks and repeats the insertion of deoxyribonucleotides that were previously added. This results in some repeats found in the template strand being replicated twice into the daughter strand. This expands the replication region with newly inserted nucleotides. The template and the daughter strand can no longer pair correctly.
5. Nucleotide excision repair proteins are mobilized to this area where one likely outcome is the expansion of nucleotides in the template strand while the other is the absence of nucleotides. Although trinucleotide contraction is possible, trinucleotide expansion occurs more frequently.

== Effects ==
Tandem repeats (the main influence for slippage replication) can be found in coding and non-coding regions. If these repeats are found in coding regions then the variations to the polynucleotide sequence can result in the formation of abnormal proteins in eukaryotes. Many human diseases have been reported to be associated with trinucleotide repeat expansions including Huntington's disease. The HD gene is found in all human genomes. In the event that a slippage event occurs there can be a large expansion in the tandem repeats of the HD gene. An individual who is not affected by Huntington's disease will have 6-35 tandem repeats at the HD locus. However, an affected individual will have 36- 121 repeats present. The expansion of the HD locus results in a dysfunctional protein leading to Huntington's disease.

=== Disease associations ===
Huntington disease is normally progressive and results in movement, cognitive and psychiatric disorders. These disorders can lead to a severe impact on an individual's daily activities, making it hard for proper communication and independent actions to take place. Replication slippage can also lead to other neurodegenerative diseases in humans. These include spinal and bulbar muscular atrophy ( trinucleotide expansion in the AR gene), dentatorubral–pallidoluysian atrophy ( trinucleotide expansion in the DRPLA gene), spinocerebellar ataxia type 1 ( trinucleotide expansion in the SCA1gene), Machado-Joseph disease ( trinucleotide expansion in the SCA3 gene), myotonic dystrophy ( trinucleotide expansion in the DMPK gene), and Friedreich's ataxia ( a trinuncleotide expansion in the X25 gene). Therefore, replication slippage leads to a form of trinucleotide expansion which results in serious changes to protein structure.

== Self-acceleration ==
SSM events can result in either insertions or deletions. Insertions are thought to be self-accelerating: as repeats grow longer, the probability of subsequent mispairing events increases. Insertions can expand simple tandem repeats by one or more units. In long repeats, expansions may involve two or more units. For example, insertion of a single repeat unit in GAGAGA expands the sequence to GAGAGAGA, while insertion of two repeat units in [GA]_{6} would produce [GA]_{8}. Genomic regions with a high proportion of repeated DNA sequences (tandem repeats, microsatellites) are prone to strand slippage during DNA replication and DNA repair.

Trinucleotide repeat expansion is a cause of a number of human diseases including fragile X syndrome, Huntington's disease, several spinocerebellar ataxias, myotonic dystrophy and Friedrich ataxia.

== Evolution of diverse adjacent repeats ==
The combination of SSM events with point mutation is thought to account for the evolution of more complex repeat units. Mutations followed by expansion would result in the formation of new types of adjacent short tandem repeat units. For example, a transversion could change the simple two- base repeat [GA]_{10} to [GA]_{4}GATA[GA]_{2}. This could then be expanded to[GA]_{4}[GATA]_{3}[GA]_{2} by two subsequent SSM events. Simple repetitive DNA sequences containing a variety of adjacent short tandem repeats are commonly observed in non-protein coding regions of eukaryotic genomes.
