= Incisionless Fritsch otoplasty =

Minimally invasive procedure for pinning protruding ears

The incisionless Fritsch otoplasty is a minimally invasive procedure for pinning protruding ears.

== History ==
Michael H. Fritsch, MD, Professor, Indianapolis, Indiana, USA, named his method “Incisionless Otoplasty” and published it under this name in 1995, 2004, 2009 and 2013.

== Surgical procedure ==
The technique is used for protuberant "lop" ears to correct the problem in the least invasive way. From the back of the ear, permanent, non-absorbable sutures (called by Fritsch "retention sutures") are placed invisibly into the cartilage of the external ear pinna with a unique technique, whereby the stitch passes in and out of the same needle hole achieve the desired pathway for the suture to correct the protuberant ear. Kaye and others, made open micro-incisions to get the suture under the skin. When the sutures are tightened, the ear moves towards the head. Patients were operated on using only the percutaneous incisionless technique. Fritsch pointed out that some ears needed not only re-creation of the antihelical fold of the pinna external ear, but also, a closer approximation of the conchal bowl to the mastoid process behind the ear; these retention sutures were also placed without incisions. Ears were satisfactorily corrected with this technique. This corresponds to the conventional Furnas Method, but without the large vertical access incision.

Fritsch also sometimes combined with a technique of the traditional methods for correcting protruding earlobes, by opening the back of the earlobe and removing soft tissue from it. He found that his minimally invasive technique did not produce any satisfactory results in the case of pronounced conchal hyperplasia: "Mega ear". This is how Fritsch described his method in 1995.

In his later publications, the antihelical cartilage "spring" is scratched or scored, sometimes quite deeply, with only a needle and without incisions. Narrow tunnels in the auricular cartilage created micro-scarring bands to augment the retention sutures and permanently correct the conchal bowl correction and pinna antihelix. Later, Fritsch sometimes removed excessively thick soft-tissue or bone between the conchal bowl and the mastoid through 2mm incisions. In this way, the Fritsch technique became a combination of several minimally invasive methods. Others have adopted this technique and modified it according to their own insights.

== Risks and complications ==
According to Fritsch: Possibilities could include rare infection; bleeding; hematoma; pain; discomfort; swelling; suture breakage; post-auricular suture bridging; epithelial inclusion with cyst formation.

According to Weerda: Cosmetically, the different procedures of all otoplasty surgery types can cause disfiguring cartilage edges along the anterior surface of the antihelix if the cartilage is scored too deeply or the perichondrium is injured; post-operative bleeding; hematoma; relapse (ears protruding again); hypersensitivity; pain with pressure and cold, pressure damage (necrosis) from too tightly fitting hard bandages; perichondritis (inflammation of the cartilage); stronger asymmetry of the ears (see also on otoplasty).
