= Sherman paradox =

Early term for the triplet-repeat pattern of inheritance found in fragile X syndrome

The Sherman paradox was a term used to describe the anomalous pattern of inheritance found in fragile X syndrome. The phenomenon is also referred to as anticipation or dynamic mutation.

== Background ==
The paradox was named in the late 1980s after American geneticist Stephanie Sherman, who studied the inheritance patterns of people with fragile X syndrome. Sherman observed that the effects of fragile X syndrome seemed to occur more frequently with each passing generation. This observation became known as the Sherman paradox.

The paradox was ultimately explained by insights into the mutation process that gives rise to the syndrome. Sherman theorized that the gene responsible for fragile X syndrome becomes mutated through a two-step process. The first mutation, called the 'premutation', doesn't cause any clinical symptoms. A second mutation was required to convert the 'premutation' into a 'full mutation' capable of causing the clinical symptoms associated with fragile X syndrome. Additionally, premutations must pass through females in order to transform into the full mutation.

Fragile X syndrome is so named because of the appearance of the X chromosome in individuals with fragile X. Under an electron microscope, a region on the long arm of the chromosome resembles a thin string. Investigation showed that this region consists of a CGG repeat triplet in both normal and diseased individuals. The difference between normal and diseased is the length of the repeat; the repeat is longer where fragile X syndrome is present. When the length of the repeat surpasses a critical threshold, symptoms of the disorder appear and they increase in likelihood and severity with further length. Even below this threshold there is a range where the repeat becomes unstable during meiosis.

In normal individuals, an insertion of extra CGGs is unlikely. However, as the length of the repeat increases, the probability of additional triplet insertions increases. When the expansion reaches the danger range, the carrier is still unaffected, but the risk of further mutation becomes significant. This is called the premutation range. Once the fragile X syndrome emerges, symptoms worsen from generation to generation because of the self-promoting aspect of the mutation.

== Triplet repeats and disease ==
A similar mechanism, involving triplet repeats, underlies myotonic dystrophy, spinocerebellar ataxia and Huntington's disease. In Huntington's disease, in contrast to fragile X, somatic as well as germline mutations occur. Autopsies of affected individuals reveal an accumulation of long repeats of CAG in DNA in the striatum. In both conditions, effects are less severe if the long repeat is interspersed with other triplets.
