= Fragile X syndrome =

X-linked dominant genetic disorder

- Other names: Martin–Bell syndrome, Escalante syndrome
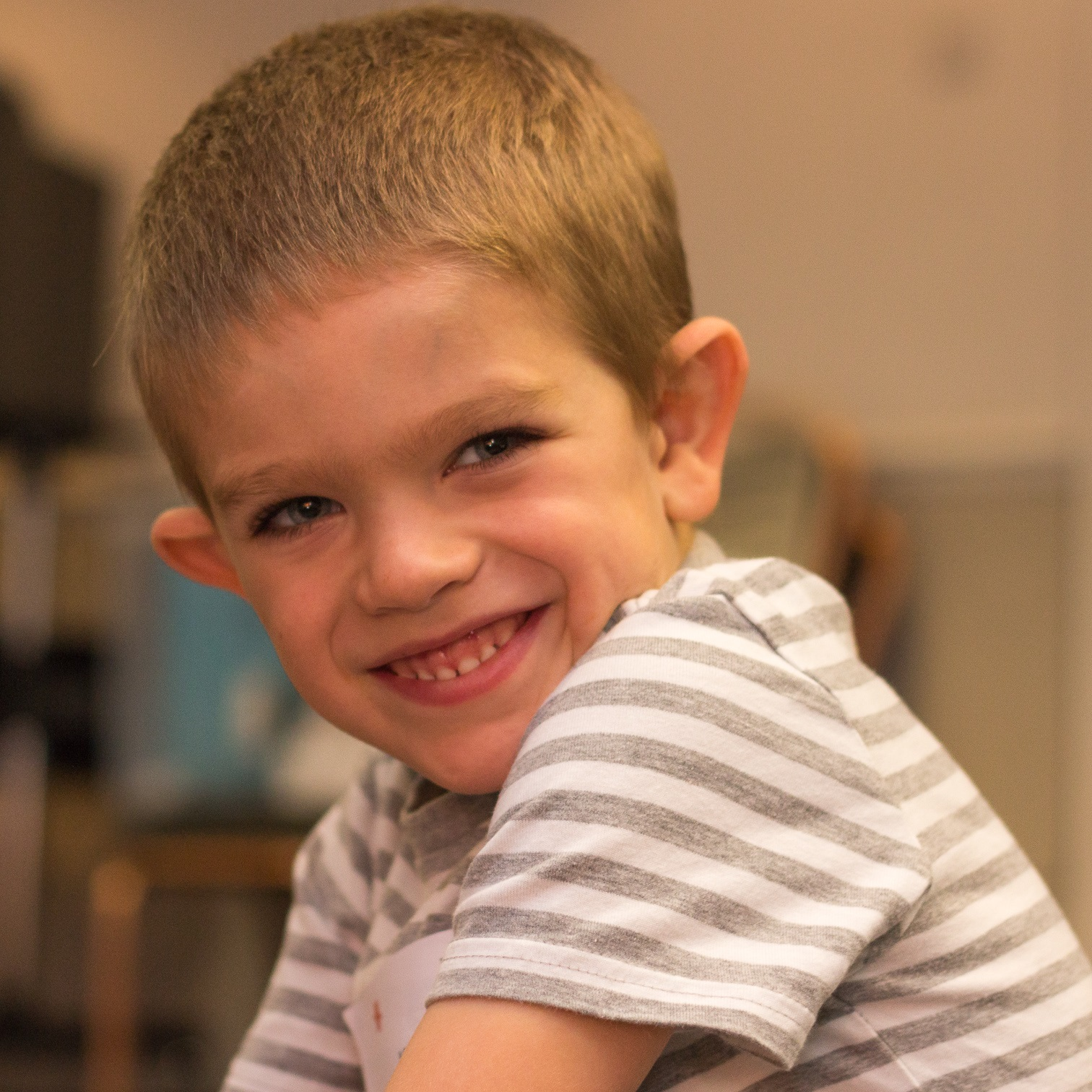
- Boy with protruding ears, a characteristic of fragile X syndrome
- Specialty: Medical genetics, pediatrics, psychiatry
- Symptoms: Intellectual disability, long and narrow face, large ears, flexible fingers, autistic behavior, large testicles
- Complications: Seizures
- Usual onset: Noticeable by age 2
- Duration: Lifelong
- Causes: Genetic (X-linked recessive)
- Diagnostic method: Genetic testing
- Treatment: Supportive care, early interventions
- Frequency: 1 in 4,000 (males), 1 in 8,000 (females)

Fragile X syndrome (FXS) is a genetic neurodevelopmental disorder. The average IQ in males with FXS is under 55, while affected females tend to be in the borderline to normal range, typically around 70–85. Physical features may include a long and narrow face, large ears, flexible fingers, and large testicles. About a third of those affected have features of autism such as problems with social interactions and delayed speech. Hyperactivity is common, and seizures occur in about 10%. Males are usually more affected than females.

This disorder and finding of fragile X syndrome has an X-linked dominant inheritance. It is typically caused by an expansion of the CGG triplet repeat within the FMR1 (fragile X messenger ribonucleoprotein 1) gene on the X chromosome. This results in silencing (methylation) of this part of the gene and a deficiency of the resultant protein (FMRP), which is required for the normal development of connections between neurons. Diagnosis requires genetic testing to determine the number of CGG repeats in the FMR1 gene. Normally, there are between 5 and 40 repeats; fragile X syndrome occurs with more than 200. A premutation is said to be present when the gene has between 55 and 200 repeats; females with a premutation have an increased risk of having an affected child. Testing for premutation carriers may allow for genetic counseling.

There is no cure or approved medications for treating the condition. Early intervention is recommended, as it provides the most opportunity for developing a full range of skills. These interventions may include special education, occupational therapy, speech therapy, physical therapy, or behavioral therapy. Medications may be used to treat associated anxiety, seizures, mood problems, aggressive behavior, or ADHD. Fragile X syndrome tends to show more symptoms on affected males since females have another X chromosome which can compensate for the damaged one.

Fragile X syndrome is the most common cause of inherited intellectual disability, affecting an estimated 1 per 4,000 people. It is also the most common single gene cause of autism.

== Signs and symptoms ==
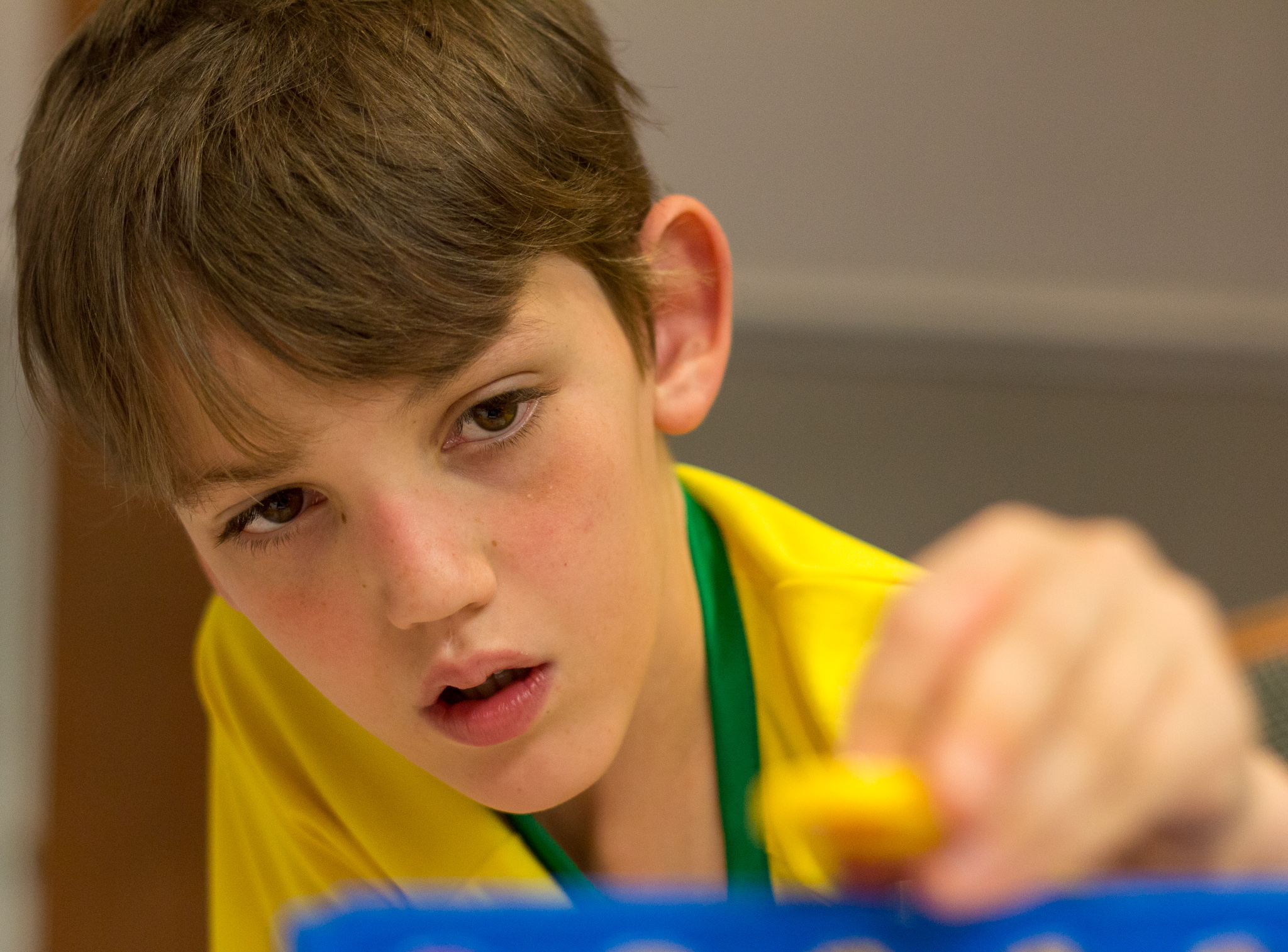
Prominent characteristics of the syndrome include an elongated face and large or protruding ears.

Aside from intellectual disability, prominent characteristics of the syndrome may include an elongated face, large or protruding ears, flat feet, larger testes (macroorchidism), and low muscle tone. Recurrent otitis media (middle ear infection) and sinusitis is common during early childhood. Speech may be cluttered or nervous. Behavioral characteristics may include stereotypic movements (e.g., hand-flapping) and atypical social development, particularly shyness, limited eye contact, memory problems, and difficulty with face encoding. Some individuals with fragile X syndrome also meet the diagnostic criteria for autism.

Males with a full mutation display virtually complete penetrance and will therefore almost always display symptoms of FXS, while females with a full mutation generally display a penetrance of about 50% as a result of having a second, normal X chromosome. Females with FXS may have symptoms ranging from mild to severe, although they are generally less affected than males due to variability in X-inactivation.

=== Physical phenotype ===
- Large, protruding ears (both)
- Long face (vertical maxillary excess)
- High-arched palate (related to the above)
- Hyperextensible finger joints
- Hyperextensible thumbs ('double-jointed')
- Flat feet
- Soft skin, sometimes described as velvety (especially on the palms) or redundant skin on the back of the hands.
- Postpubescent macroorchidism (large testicles in males after puberty)
- Hypotonia (low muscle tone)

=== Intellectual development ===
Individuals with FXS may present anywhere on a continuum from learning disabilities in the context of a normal intelligence quotient (IQ) to severe intellectual disability, with an average IQ of 40 in males who have complete silencing of the FMR1 gene. Females, who tend to be less affected, generally have an IQ which is normal or borderline with learning difficulties. The main difficulties in individuals with FXS are with working and short-term memory, executive function, visual memory, visual-spatial relationships, and mathematics, with verbal abilities being relatively unaffected.

Data on intellectual development in FXS are limited. However, there is some evidence that standardized IQ decreases over time in the majority of cases, apparently as a result of slowed intellectual development. A longitudinal study looking at pairs of siblings where one child was affected and the other was not found that affected children had an intellectual learning rate which was 55% slower than unaffected children.

Individuals with FXS often demonstrated language and communicative problems. This may be related to muscle function of the mouth and frontal-lobe deficits.

=== Autism ===
Fragile X syndrome is the most common genetic cause of autism. This finding has resulted in medical screening for FMR1 mutation in individuals who present with autism. Of those with fragile X syndrome, prevalence of concurrent autism spectrum disorder (ASD) has been estimated to be between 15 and 60%, with the variation due to differences in diagnostic methods and the high frequency of autistic features in individuals with fragile X syndrome not meeting the DSM criteria for an ASD.

Although individuals with FXS have difficulties in forming friendships, those with FXS and ASD characteristically also have difficulties with reciprocal conversation with their peers. Social withdrawal behaviors, including avoidance and indifference, appear to be the best predictors of ASD in FXS, with avoidance appearing to be correlated more with social anxiety while indifference was more strongly correlated to ASD. When both autism and FXS are present, a greater language deficit and lower IQ is observed as compared to children with only FXS.Genetic mouse models of FXS have also been shown to have autistic-like behaviors.

=== Social interaction ===
FXS is characterized by social anxiety, including poor eye contact, gaze aversion, prolonged time to commence social interaction, and challenges forming peer relationships. Social anxiety is one of the most common features associated with FXS, with up to 75% of males in one series characterized as having excessive shyness and 50% having panic attacks. Social anxiety in individuals with FXS is related to challenges with face encoding, the ability to recognize a face that one has seen before.

It appears that individuals with FXS are interested in social interaction and display greater empathy than groups with other causes of intellectual disability, but display anxiety and withdrawal when placed in unfamiliar situations with unfamiliar people. This may range from mild social withdrawal, which is predominantly associated with shyness, to severe social withdrawal, which may be associated with co-existing autism spectrum disorder.

Females with FXS frequently display shyness, social anxiety and social avoidance or withdrawal. In addition, premutation in females has been found to be associated with social anxiety.

Individuals with FXS showed decreased ability to recruit more areas of the brain for more complex working memory or problem solvings tasks as seen on functional MRI.

=== Mental health ===
Attention deficit hyperactivity disorder (ADHD) is found in the majority of males with FXS and 30% of females, making it the most common psychiatric diagnosis in those with FXS. Children with fragile X have very short attention spans, are hyperactive, and show hypersensitivity to visual, auditory, tactile, and olfactory stimuli. These children have difficulty in large crowds due to the loud noises and this can lead to tantrums due to hyperarousal. Hyperactivity and disruptive behavior peak in the preschool years and then gradually decline with age, although inattentive symptoms are generally lifelong.

Aside from the characteristic social phobia features, a range of other anxiety symptoms are very commonly associated with FXS, with symptoms typically spanning a number of psychiatric diagnoses but not fulfilling any of the criteria in full. Children with FXS pull away from light touch and can find textures of materials to be irritating. Transitions from one location to another can be difficult for children with FXS. Behavioral therapy can be used to decrease the child's sensitivity in some cases. Behaviors such as hand flapping and biting, as well as aggression, can be an expression of anxiety.

Perseveration is a common communicative and behavioral characteristic in FXS. Children with FXS may repeat a certain ordinary activity over and over. In speech, the trend is not only in repeating the same phrase but also talking about the same subject continually. Cluttered speech and self-talk are commonly seen. Self-talk includes talking with oneself using different tones and pitches. Although only a minority of FXS cases will meet the criteria for obsessive–compulsive disorder (OCD), a significant majority will have symptoms of obsession. However, as individuals with FXS generally find these behaviors pleasurable, unlike individuals with OCD, they are more frequently referred to as stereotypic behaviors.

Mood symptoms in individuals with FXS rarely meet diagnostic criteria for a major mood disorder as they are typically not of sustained duration. Instead, these are usually transient and related to stressors, and may involve labile (fluctuating) mood, irritability, self-injury and aggression.

Individuals with fragile X-associated tremor/ataxia syndrome (FXTAS) are likely to experience combinations of dementia, mood, and anxiety disorders. Males with the FMR1 premutation and clinical evidence of FXTAS were found to have increased occurrence of somatization, obsessive–compulsive disorder, interpersonal sensitivity, depression, phobic anxiety, and psychoticism.

=== Vision ===
Ophthalmologic problems include strabismus. This requires early identification to avoid amblyopia. Surgery or patching are usually necessary to treat strabismus if diagnosed early. Refractive errors in patients with FXS are also common.

=== Neurology ===
Individuals with FXS are at a higher risk of developing seizures, with rates between 10% and 40% reported in the literature. In larger study populations the frequency varies between 13% and 18%, consistent with a recent survey of caregivers which found that 14% of males and 6% of females experienced seizures. The seizures tend to be partial, are generally not frequent, and are amenable to treatment with medication.

Individuals who are carriers of premutation alleles are at risk for developing fragile X-associated tremor/ataxia syndrome (FXTAS), a progressive neurodegenerative disease. It is seen in approximately half of male carriers over the age of 70, while penetrance in females is lower. Typically, onset of tremor occurs in the sixth decade of life, with subsequent progression to ataxia (loss of coordination) and gradual cognitive decline.

=== Working memory ===
From their 40s onward, males with FXS begin developing progressively more severe problems in performing tasks that require the central executive of working memory. Working memory involves the temporary storage of information 'in mind', while processing the same or other information. Phonological memory (or verbal working memory) deteriorates with age in males, while visual-spatial memory is not found to be directly related to age. Males often experience an impairment in the functioning of the phonological loop. The CGG length is significantly correlated with central executive and the visual–spatial memory. However, in a premutation individual, CGG length is only significantly correlated with the central executive, not with either phonological memory or visual–spatial memory.

=== Fertility ===
About 20% of women who are carriers for the fragile X premutation are affected by Fragile X-associated primary ovarian insufficiency (FXPOI), which is defined as primary ovarian insufficiency, which is menopause occurring before 40 years of age (average age at menopause is 51 years old in the US). The number of CGG repeats correlates with penetrance and age of onset, but it is not a linear relationship. However primary ovarian insufficiency is more common in premutation carriers than in women with the full mutation, and the highest risk for FXPOI is observed in women with between 70-100 repeats. FXPOI is one of three Fragile X-associated Disorders (FXD) caused by changes in the FMR1 gene. FXPOI affects female premutation carriers, of which is caused by the FMR1 gene, when their ovaries are not functioning properly. Women with FXPOI may exhibit changes in menstrual cycles and have changes in hormone levels but not be considered menopausal. Women with FXPOI still have the chance to get pregnant in about 10% of cases, because their ovaries occasionally release viable eggs through "escape" ovulation. FXPOI is the most common cause of hereditary primary ovarian insufficiency. There is not specific treatment for FXPOI, but hormonal therapy is recommended as a treatment, as for other women with primary ovarian insufficiency.

In women with infertility, and a family history of infertility, there is a 7% risk of FXPOI so genetic testing is recommended.

FMRP is a chromatin-binding protein that functions in the DNA damage response. FMRP also occupies sites on meiotic chromosomes and regulates the dynamics of the DNA damage response machinery during spermatogenesis.

== Causes ==
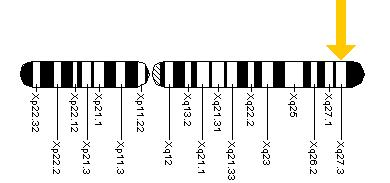
Location of the FMR1 gene on the X chromosome

Fragile X syndrome is a genetic disorder which occurs as a result of a mutation of the Fragile X Messenger Ribonucleoprotein 1 (FMR1) gene on the X chromosome, most commonly an increase in the number of CGG trinucleotide repeats in the 5' untranslated region of FMR1. Mutation at that site is found in 1 out of about every 2000 males and 1 out of about every 259 females. Incidence of the disorder itself is about 1 in every 3600 males and 1 in 4000–6000 females. Although this accounts for over 98% of cases, FXS can also occur as a result of point mutations affecting FMR1.

In unaffected individuals, the FMR1 gene contains 5–44 repeats of the sequence CGG, most commonly 29 or 30 repeats. Between 45 and 54 repeats is considered a "grey zone", with a premutation allele generally considered to be between 55 and 200 repeats in length. Individuals with fragile X syndrome have a full mutation of the FMR1 allele, with over 200 CGG repeats. In these individuals with a repeat expansion greater than 200, there is methylation of the CGG repeat expansion and FMR1 promoter, leading to the silencing of the FMR1 gene and a lack of its product.

This methylation of FMR1 in chromosome band Xq27.3 is believed to result in constriction of the X chromosome which appears 'fragile' under the microscope at that point, a phenomenon that gave the syndrome its name. One study found that FMR1 silencing is mediated by the FMR1 mRNA. The FMR1 mRNA contains the transcribed CGG-repeat tract as part of the 5' untranslated region, which hybridizes to the complementary CGG-repeat portion of the FMR1 gene to form an RNA·DNA duplex.

A subset of people with intellectual disability and symptoms resembling fragile X syndrome are found to have point mutations in FMR1. This subset lacked the CGG repeat expansion in FMR1 traditionally associated with fragile X syndrome. The first complete DNA sequence of the repeat expansion in someone with the full mutation was generated by scientists in 2012 using SMRT sequencing.

=== Inheritance ===
Fragile X syndrome has traditionally been considered an X-linked recessive condition with variable expressivity and possibly reduced penetrance. The likelihood of transmission depends on the parent's sex, the X chromosome carrying the mutation, and the number of CGG repeats in the premutation.

Due to genetic anticipation and X-inactivation in females, the inheritance of Fragile X syndrome does not follow the usual pattern of X-linked dominant inheritance, and some scholars have proposed discontinuing labeling X-linked disorders as dominant or recessive. Males with a full mutation are usually affected and infertile, while carrier females have a 50% chance of passing on the mutation.

Before the FMR1 gene was discovered, analysis of pedigrees showed the presence of male carriers who were asymptomatic, with their grandchildren affected by the condition at a higher rate than their siblings suggesting that genetic anticipation was occurring. This tendency for future generations to be affected at a higher frequency became known as the Sherman paradox after its description in 1985. Due to this, male children often have a greater degree of symptoms than their mothers.

The explanation for this phenomenon is that male carriers pass on their premutation to all of their daughters, with the length of the FMR1 CGG repeat typically not increasing during meiosis, the cell division that is required to produce sperm. Incidentally, males with a full mutation only pass on premutations to their daughters. However, females with a full mutation are able to pass this full mutation on, so theoretically there is a 50% chance that a child will be affected. In addition, the length of the CGG repeat frequently does increase during meiosis in female premutation carriers due to instability and so, depending on the length of their premutation, they may pass on a full mutation to their children who will then be affected. Repeat expansion is considered to be a consequence of strand slippage either during DNA replication or DNA repair synthesis.

Carriers

Clinical and diagnostic testing taken from a 2025 study reported that around 31% women who are a carrier for the FMR1 premutation were later diagnosed with FXTAS (Fragile X-Associated Tremor/Ataxia Syndrome). While more common in males than females, recent studies reveal how females are affected. In addition to premutation carriers being at risk for FXTAS, they are also at risk for a variety of other medical conditions. Female carriers are more at risk for thyroid disease, hypertension and chronic muscle pain than the general population. Female carriers are also more at risk of having migraines than male carriers. The most common health condition found in premutation carriers are neuropsychiatric disorders. Anxiety disorder, ADHD and depression are common in carriers. Depression is associated with CGG repeats and premutation carriers have around 55–200 CGG repeats. Most individuals have less than 44 CGG repeats. Some males with the premutation show traits of Fragile-X including an increased size in testicles, social impairment, delays in speech and language, and hyperactivity. Traits also include wider outer canthal distance and developmental delays. Female carriers often show little to no physical phenotype, but have an increased risks for premature ovarian failure (FXPOI) and lowered bone density.

==== Mosaicism ====
Mosaicism refers to cases where individuals have both full mutation and premutation copies. Mosaicism can result from instability in the CGG repeats, and affected individuals may show classic symptoms, although some evidence suggests higher intellectual abilities compared to those with a full mutation.

== Pathophysiology ==
FMRP is found throughout the body, but in highest concentrations within the brain and testes. It appears to be primarily responsible for selectively binding to around 4% of mRNA in mammalian brains and transporting it out of the cell nucleus and to the synapses of neurons. Most of these mRNA targets have been found to be located in the dendrites of neurons, and brain tissue from humans with FXS and mouse models shows abnormal dendritic spines, which are required to increase contact with other neurons. The subsequent abnormalities in the formation and function of synapses and development of neural circuits result in impaired neuroplasticity, an integral part of memory and learning. Connectome changes have long been suspected to be involved in the sensory pathophysiology and most recently a range of circuit alterations have been shown, involving structurally increased local connectivity and functionally decreased long-range connectivity.

In addition, FMRP has been implicated in several signalling pathways that are being targeted by a number of drugs undergoing clinical trials. The group 1 metabotropic glutamate receptor (mGluR) pathway, which includes mGluR1 and mGluR5, is involved in mGluR-dependent long term depression (LTD) and long term potentiation (LTP), both of which are important mechanisms in learning. The lack of FMRP, which represses mRNA production and thereby protein synthesis, leads to exaggerated LTD. FMRP also appears to affect dopamine pathways in the prefrontal cortex which is believed to result in the attention deficit, hyperactivity and impulse control problems associated with FXS. The downregulation of GABA pathways, which serve an inhibitory function and are involved in learning and memory, may be a factor in the anxiety symptoms which are commonly seen in FXS.

Research in a mouse model of FSX shows that cortical neurons receive reduced sensory information (hyposensitivity), contrary to the common assumption that these neurons are hypersensitive, accompanied by enhanced contextual information, accumulated from previous experiences. Therefore, these results suggest that the hypersensitive phenotype of affected individuals might arise from mismatched contextual input onto these neurons.

== Diagnosis ==
Clinical diagnosis relies on identifying a variant of FMR1 associated with decreased function alongside moderate to severe intellectual impairment, particularly in males or moderate in females. Diagnostic tests include PCR to analyze the number of CGG repeats, Southern blot analysis, and examination of AGG trinucleotides in the FMR1 gene region.

Cytogenetic analysis for fragile X syndrome was first available in the late 1970s when diagnosis of the syndrome and carrier status could be determined by culturing cells in a folate deficient medium and then assessing for "fragile sites" (discontinuity of staining in the region of the trinucleotide repeat) on the long arm of the X chromosome. This technique proved unreliable, however, as the fragile site was often seen in less than 40% of an individual's cells. This was not as much of a problem in males, but in female carriers, where the fragile site could generally only be seen in 10% of cells, the mutation often could not be visualised.

Since the 1990s, more sensitive molecular techniques have been used to determine carrier status. The fragile X abnormality is now directly determined by analysis of the number of CGG repeats using polymerase chain reaction (PCR) and methylation status using Southern blot analysis. By determining the number of CGG repeats on the X chromosome, this method allows for more accurate assessment of risk for premutation carriers in terms of their own risk of fragile X associated syndromes, as well as their risk of having affected children. Because this method only tests for expansion of the CGG repeat, individuals with FXS due to missense mutations or deletions involving FMR1 will not be diagnosed using this test and should therefore undergo sequencing of the FMR1 gene if there is clinical suspicion of FXS.

Prenatal testing with chorionic villus sampling or amniocentesis allows diagnosis of FMR1 mutation while the fetus is in utero and appears to be reliable.

Early diagnosis of fragile X syndrome or carrier status is important for providing early intervention in children or fetuses with the syndrome, and allowing genetic counselling with regards to the potential for a couple's future children to be affected. Most parents notice delays in speech and language skills, difficulties in social and emotional domains as well as sensitivity levels in certain situations with their children.

== Management ==
There is no cure for the underlying defects of FXS. Management of FXS may include speech therapy, behavioral therapy, occupational therapy, special education, or individualised educational plans, and, when necessary, treatment of physical abnormalities. Persons with fragile X syndrome in their family histories are advised to seek genetic counseling to assess the likelihood of having children who are affected, and how severe any impairments may be in affected descendants.

=== Daily routine ===
Individuals with full mutation Fragile X Syndrome may experience challenges in daily living. Individuals with FXS often benefit from consistent routines and predictability, as this reduces anxiety. Some individuals with FXS may experience limited social skills as well as social anxiety which makes it hard for them to form close bonds with others. Everyday activities such as traveling, making purchases at a store and interacting with peers may be difficult. Individuals may experience difficulties in achieving functional independence. Independent living skills and employment capabilities are typically limited. However, some adults are able to achieve independence through support and accommodations.

=== Developmental delays ===
Infants with Fragile X Syndrome may experience hypotonia, feeding problems and vomiting, but all developmental delays are subtle. By a year, language delays begin to be noticeable. These delays are followed by an increased amount of tantrums and irritability as an individual approaches 3 years old. By the time children with FXS reach school age, they face significant learning challenges including verbal comprehension, working memory and understanding complex language. By adolescence, social challenges increase as well as aggression, anxiety and irritability. Going into adulthood, FXS individuals require support in daily living and mental health may worsen.

=== Medication ===
Current trends in treating the disorder include medications for symptom-based treatments that aim to minimize the secondary characteristics associated with the disorder. If an individual is diagnosed with FXS, genetic counseling for testing family members at risk for carrying the full mutation or premutation is a critical first-step. Due to a higher prevalence of FXS in boys, the most commonly used medications are stimulants that target hyperactivity, impulsivity, and attentional problems. For co-morbid disorders with FXS, antidepressants such as selective serotonin reuptake inhibitors (SSRIs) are utilized to treat the underlying anxiety, obsessive-compulsive behaviors, and mood disorders. Following antidepressants, antipsychotics such as risperidone and quetiapine are used to treat high rates of self-injurious, aggressive and aberrant behaviors in this population (Bailey Jr et al., 2012). Anticonvulsants are another set of pharmacological treatments used to control seizures as well as mood swings in 13–18% of individuals with FXS. Drugs targeting the mGluR5 (metabotropic glutamate receptors) that are linked with synaptic plasticity are especially beneficial for targeted symptoms of FXS. Lithium is also currently being used in clinical trials with humans, showing significant improvements in behavioral functioning, adaptive behavior, and verbal memory. Few studies suggested using folic acid, but more researches are needed due to the low quality of that evidence. Alongside pharmacological treatments, environmental influences such as home environment and parental abilities as well as behavioral interventions such as speech therapy, sensory integration, etc. all factor in together to promote adaptive functioning for individuals with FXS. While metformin may reduce body weight in persons with fragile X syndrome, it is uncertain whether it improves neurological or psychiatric symptoms.

Current pharmacological treatment centers on managing problem behaviors and psychiatric symptoms associated with FXS. However, as there has been very little research done in this specific population, the evidence to support the use of these medications in individuals with FXS is poor.

ADHD, which affects the majority of boys and 30% of girls with FXS, is frequently treated using stimulants. However, the use of stimulants in the fragile X population is associated with a greater frequency of adverse events including increased anxiety, irritability and mood lability. Anxiety, as well as mood and obsessive-compulsive symptoms, may be treated using SSRIs, although these can also aggravate hyperactivity and cause disinhibited behavior. Atypical antipsychotics can be used to stabilise mood and control aggression, especially in those with comorbid ASD. However, monitoring is required for metabolic side effects including weight gain and diabetes, as well as movement disorders related to extrapyramidal side effects such as tardive dyskinesia. Individuals with coexisting seizure disorder may require treatment with anticonvulsants.

== Prognosis ==
A 2013 review stated that life expectancy for FXS was 12 years lower than the general population and that the causes of death were similar to those found for the general population.

== Pharmacological therapy ==
There are no pharmacologic therapies approved specifically for fragile X syndrome. Medications are sometimes used to treat the co-morbidities that often accompany FXS, including seizures, anxiety, or disruptive behaviors.

Research into the etiology of FXS has given rise to many attempts at drug discovery. The increased understanding of the molecular mechanisms of disease in FXS has led to the development of therapies targeting the affected pathways. Evidence from mouse models shows that mGluR5 antagonists (blockers) can rescue dendritic spine abnormalities and seizures, as well as cognitive and behavioral problems, and may show promise in the treatment of FXS. Two new drugs, AFQ-056 (mavoglurant) and dipraglurant, as well as the repurposed drug fenobam are currently undergoing human trials for the treatment of FXS. There is also early evidence for the efficacy of arbaclofen, a GABA_{B} agonist, in improving social withdrawal in individuals with FXS and ASD. In addition, there is evidence from mouse models that minocycline, an antibiotic used for the treatment of acne, rescues abnormalities of the dendrites. An open trial in humans has shown promising results, although there is currently no evidence from controlled trials to support its use. Zatolmilast, a phosphodiesterase-4 inhibitor works to inhibit cyclic adenosine monophosphate (cAMP) breakdown, with the resultant higher levels of cAMP in the brain thought to enhance neuronal connectivity. Zatolmilast has shown increased caregiver symptom ratings and increased cognitive scores in those with FXS in a small clinical trial.

== History ==
In 1943, British neurologist James Purdon Martin and British geneticist Julia Bell described a pedigree of X-linked intellectual disability, without considering the macroorchidism (larger testicles). In 1969, Herbert Lubs first sighted an unusual "marker X chromosome" in association with intellectual disability. In 1970, Frederick Hecht coined the term "fragile site". And, in 1985, Felix F. de la Cruz outlined extensively the physical, psychological, and cytogenetic characteristics of those with the condition in addition to prospects for therapy. Continued advocacy later won him an honour through the FRAXA Research Foundation in December 1998.

Research in 2020 suggested that Idiocy and Imbecility (1877) by William Wotherspoon Ireland contained the earliest depiction of a person with FXS.

== See also ==
- List of syndromes
- Toxidrome
- Symptom
- Sequence (medicine)
- Characteristics of syndromic ASD conditions
