= Dynamical genetics =

Study of the alteration of DNA by protein complexes

Dynamical genetics is a subfield of molecular biology and genetics that studies phenomena in which physiological protein complexes alter DNA. The study of such mechanisms is important because they promote useful functions, for example the immune system recombination (on the individual scale) and chromosomal crossover (on the evolutionary scale). Furthermore, when such mechanisms malfunction, diseases such as neurodegenerative disorders are caused.

Typical examples of dynamical genetics subjects are:

- Dynamic mutations, a term introduced by Robert I. Richards and Grant R. Sutherland to indicate mutations caused by other mutations; this phenomenon often involves the variable number tandem repeats, and is closely related to many neurodegenerative diseases, as the trinucleotide repeat disorders (interpreted by Anita Harding).
- Dynamic genome, a term introduced by Nina Fedoroff and David Botstein to indicate the transposition discovered by Barbara McClintock.
- Immune V(D)J recombination (discovered by Susumu Tonegawa) and isotype class switching, two terms introduced to indicate two kinds of immune system recombinations, which are the main cause of the enormous variety of antibodies.
- Horizontal DNA transfer (discovered by Frederick Griffith), which indicates the DNA transfer between two organisms.
- Crossing-over (discovered by Thomas Hunt Morgan) mediated by formation and unwinding (by means of peculiar enzymatic complexes such as helicase) of uncommon four-helix DNA structures known as G-quadruplexes (discovered by Martin Gellert, Marie N. Lipsett, and David R. Davies).
