= ALS Functional Rating Scale – Revised =

Medical tool

Amyotrophic lateral sclerosis (ALS) is a neurodegenerative disease that typically affects adults around 54–67 years of age, although anyone can be diagnosed with the disease. People diagnosed with ALS live on average 2–4 years after diagnosis due to the quick progression of the disease. The progression and severity of ALS is rated by doctors on the ALS Functional Rating Scale, which has been revised and is referred to as ALSFRS-R (ALS Functional Rating Scale – Revised or revised ALS Functional Rating Scale).

== Criteria ==
ALSFRS-R includes 12 questions that can have a score of 0 to 4. A score of 0 on a question would indicate no function while a score of 4 would indicate full function. This scale has been useful for doctors in diagnosing patients, measuring disease progression and also for researchers when selecting patients for a study and measuring the potential effects of a clinical trial.

The ALSFRS-R scale has some limitations though since it is not useful to compare scores of people who present with different onset. In ALS the main type of onset is bulbar followed by limb-onset ALS which describes the region of motor neurons first affected. Individuals may also present with respiratory-onset ALS, but this occurs very rarely. Since there are three different types of ALS, ALSFRS-R scores are often grouped in categories depending on type of onset.

Since there are three main pathways of progression, the questions are also divided in relation to the types of onset. Questions 1 to 3 are related to bulbar onset, questions 4 to 9 are related to limb onset and questions 10 to 12 are related to respiratory onset. Further developments of the ALSFRS-R include an extended version (ALSFRS-EX) to mitigate the floor effect and a version with explanatory notes, which is particularly suitable for self-assessment (ALSFRS-R-SE, self-explanatory) and has a strong agreement with the harmonized SOP for interview-based assessment.

== Progression ==
ALSFRS-R scores calculated at diagnosis can be compared to scores throughout time to determine the speed of progression. The rate of change, called the ALSFRS-R slope can be used as a prognostic indicator.

Although the ALSFRS-R score is a recognized prognostic indicator, it is more useful to compare various indicators including vital capacity (FVC%) and the Sickness Impact Profile (SIP) to increase the accuracy of a given prognosis.

Relating the ALSFRS-R score to staging criteria is also useful in determining prognosis. King's system relies on the clinical spread of disease as a measure of progression while Milano-Torino Staging (MiToS) utilizes the subscores produced by the ALSFRS-R to define stages.

== Questions ==
The questions used to determine an individual's ALSFRS-R score are listed below.

1. Speech
4	Normal speech processes
3	Detectable speech disturbance
2	Intelligible with repeating
1	Speech combined with nonvocal communication
0	Loss of useful speech
2. Salivation
4	Normal
3	Slight but definite excess of saliva in mouth; may have nighttime drooling
2	Moderately excessive saliva; may have minimal drooling
1	Marked excess of saliva with some drooling
0	Marked drooling; requires constant tissue or handkerchief
3. Swallowing
4	Normal eating habits
3	Early eating problems — occasional choking
2	Dietary consistency changes
1	Needs supplemental tube feeding
0	NPO (exclusively parenteral or enteral feeding)
4. Handwriting
4	Normal
3	Slow or sloppy: all words are legible
2	Not all words are legible
1	Able to grip pen but unable to write
0	Unable to grip pen
5a. Cutting food and handling utensils (patients without gastrostomy)?
4	Normal
3	Somewhat slow and clumsy, but no help needed
2	Can cut most foods, although clumsy and slow; some help needed
1	Food must be cut by someone, but can still feed slowly
0	Needs to be fed
5b. Cutting food and handling utensils (scale for patients with gastrostomy)?
4	Normal
3	Clumsy but able to perform all manipulations independently
2	Some help needed with closures and fasteners
1	Provides minimal assistance to caregiver
0	Unable to perform any aspect of task
6. Dressing and hygiene
4	Normal function
3	Independent and complete self-care with effort or decreased efficiency
2	Intermittent assistance or substitute methods
1	Needs attendant for self-care
0	Total dependence
7. Turning in bed and adjusting bed clothes
4	Normal
3	Somewhat slow and clumsy, but no help needed
2	Can turn alone or adjust sheets, but with great difficulty
1	Can initiate, but not turn or adjust sheets alone
0	Helpless
8. Walking
4	Normal
3	Early ambulation difficulties
2	Walks with assistance
1	Nonambulatory functional movement
0	No purposeful leg movement
9. Climbing stairs
4	Normal
3	Slow
2	Mild unsteadiness or fatigue
1	Needs assistance
0	Cannot do
10. Dyspnea (new)
4	None
3	Occurs when walking
2	Occurs with one or more of the following: eating, bathing, dressing (ADL)
1	Occurs at rest, difficulty breathing when either sitting or lying
0	Significant difficulty, considering using mechanical respiratory support
11. Orthopnea (new)
4	None
3	Some difficulty sleeping at night due to shortness of breath
	Does not routinely use more than two pillows
2	Needs extra pillows in order to sleep (more than two)
1	Can only sleep sitting up
0	Unable to sleep
12. Respiratory insufficiency (new)
4	None
3	Intermittent use of BiPAP
2	Continuous use of BiPAP during the night
1	Continuous use of BiPAP during the night and day
0	Invasive mechanical ventilation by intubation or tracheostomy
