= Premutation =

Genetic condition

A premutation is a situation in which there are an excess number of repeats in a gene that is at risk of increasing in length during reproduction but does not cause disease in the affected person. Fragile X syndrome, a trinucleotide repeat disorder, is a condition in which premutations may be present in the parents of affected people. Huntington's disease is another example of a trinucleotide repeat disorder in which individuals with a certain excess of repeats (27–39) of the CAG codon in the Huntingtin gene may not have the disease but are more likely to have a child with enough repeats (40+) to cause the disease.
