= Microorchidism =

Congenital human disease

Microorchidism is a genetic disorder found in males, characterized by abnormally small testicles; it is the opposite of macroorchidism, which is characterized by abnormally large testicles. The condition is associated with (and often secondary to) a number of other genetic disorders, including Klinefelter syndrome and Prader-Willi syndrome, as well as other multiple malformation disorders. The degree of abnormality (or otherwise) of the testes can be determined by the use of an orchidometer. In addition, microorchidism may also occur as a result of shrinkage or atrophy of the testis due to infections like mumps. It is distinct from testicular atrophy caused as a result of hormone therapy or injury.

== See also ==
- Endocrine system
- Orchitis
