= Spinal and bulbar muscular atrophy =

- Other names: Kennedy's disease (KD), spinobulbar muscular atrophy, bulbo-spinal atrophy, X-linked bulbospinal neuropathy (XBSN), X-linked spinal muscular atrophy type 1 (SMAX1), and many other names
- This disorder is inherited via X-linked recessive manner
- Specialty: Neurology
- Symptoms: Weakness of limb and bulbar muscles, tremor, fasciculations, muscle cramps, dysarthria and dysphagia
- Causes: Mutation in the AR gene
- Diagnostic method: Number of CAG repeats in the AR gene
- Treatment: Supportive Care
- Frequency: 0.005%

Spinal and bulbar muscular atrophy (SBMA), popularly known as Kennedy's disease, is a rare, adult-onset, X-linked recessive lower motor neuron disease caused by trinucleotide CAG repeat expansions in exon 1 of the androgen receptor (AR) gene, which results in both loss of AR function and toxic gain of function.

In males, the disease slowly progresses over decades with bulbar and lower motor neuron loss, muscle denervation, and direct skeletal muscle involvement. The disease causes progressive muscle loss with weakness, fasciculations, and cramps. Weakness of the bulbar muscles follows causing difficulties in speech (dysarthria) and swallowing (dysphagia). Female carriers do not show symptoms. Although there is no cure, supportive intervention can improve mobility and reduce complications. The prevalence of SBMA has been estimated at 2.6:100,000 males.

There is no known cure for SBMA. Supportive care is focused on preventing disease complications and maintaining independence.

== Signs and symptoms ==
Neuromuscular symptoms include muscle weakness and wasting of the limb, bulbar and respiratory muscles, tremor, fasciculations, muscle cramps, speech and swallowing difficulties, decreased or absent deep tendon reflexes, and sensory neuropathy. Other manifestations of SBMA include androgen insensitivity (gynecomastia, erectile dysfunction, reduced fertility, testicular atrophy), and metabolic impacts (glucose resistance, hyperlipidemia, fatty liver disease).

=== Neuromuscular effects ===
SBMA patients develop limb weakness which often begins in the pelvic or shoulder regions between 30 and 50 years of age. Muscle strength declines slowly, at a rate of approximately 2% per year based on quantitative muscle assessment. Muscle weakness often begins in proximal muscles, with most patients first noticing weakness in their lower limbs.

Tremor, fasciculations, and cramps are common early symptoms of SBMA. Tremor is an involuntary, somewhat rhythmic, muscle contraction and relaxation involving oscillations or twitching movements. In SBMA patients, tremor is most common in the hands, but also occur in the head, voice and lower limbs, and may be observed ten years prior to muscle weakness. Fasciculation, or fleeting muscle twitches visible under the skin, is a spontaneous, involuntary muscle contraction and relaxation, and is especially noticeable in the face and tongue of SBMA patients. Lingual atrophy occurs later in the course of the disease, but the tongue may develop an unusual shape due to coexisting denervation and reinnervation. A cramp is a sudden, involuntary, painful skeletal muscle contraction of skeletal muscle, and common in motor neuron disorders.

Bulbar symptoms (weakness of the facial and tongue muscles) typically follow limb manifestations and may start with difficulty with speech articulation (dysarthria) before swallowing difficulty (dysphagia). Dysarthria is common, with hypernasality due to incomplete lifting of soft palate, but typically remains relatively mild and seldom leads to the loss of oral communication. Signs of dysphagia include difficulty controlling solids, liquids or saliva in the mouth, coughing and choking. As the disease progresses, there is increased risk of aspiration pneumonia, which is the leading cause of death in SBMA patients. Up to half of all patients experience laryngospasm, an uncontrolled contraction (spasm) of the vocal folds, with a sense of choking, and feel that the air cannot enter or exit the airways for long seconds. Laryngospasms are often followed by a high-pitched breathing sound (stridor) due to rapid and vigorous contraction of the laryngeal sphincters. This is a frightening and hugely distressing experience, but rarely escalates to prolonged or serious episodes.

In SBMA, deep tendon reflexes are diminished or absent. Sensory involvement results in degeneration of dorsal root ganglion cells with reduced vibratory sensation (distally in the legs), neuropathic pain, and numbness. There are sporadic reports of certain psychological traits (lack of self-confidence, emotional flattening, and poor concentration), but detailed neuropsychological examination of 64 SBMA patients did not detect any abnormalities.

=== Androgen insensitivity ===
Loss of AR function in SBMA patients results in partial androgen insensitivity, including gynecomastia, erectile dysfunction, decreased libido, infertility and testicular atrophy. Patients with complete androgen insensitivity syndrome do not show symptoms of SBMA, indicating neuromuscular symptoms are not caused by a loss of AR function.

Gynecomastia, excessive enlargement of male breasts, is observed in about three quarters of SBMA patients. It typically becomes apparent after puberty, and is often the first evidence of this disease. Erectile dysfunction, decreased libido, infertility and testicular atrophy are common. One of the most disease-specific endocrine indices of SBMA is the androgen sensitivity index (luteinizing hormone / testosterone) which is elevated in 64% of cases, indicating both endocrine and exocrine testicular dysfunction.

=== Metabolic disturbances ===
Metabolic disturbances have also been reported in SBMA patients, with increased risk of insulin resistance, fatty liver disease, hyperlipidemia, and electrocardiogram (ECG) abnormalities. Impaired glucose homeostasis is a common feature of SBMA, and recent study found a significant correlation between insulin resistance and motor dysfunction in SBMA. In a group of 22 patients with SBMA, evidence of fatty liver disease was detected in all individuals by magnetic resonance spectroscopy. In a second group, liver dome magnetic resonance spectroscopy measurements were increased in participants with SBMA relative to age- and sex-matched controls. SBMA patients may have higher frequency of Brugada syndrome and other electrocardiogram (ECG) abnormalities, which if not detected, can lead to sudden death. There are no reports of cardiomyopathy. However, there are indications that SBMA patients may be more likely to have high blood pressure and elevated total cholesterol and triglycerides.

=== Natural history ===
Progression of muscle weakness is slow, with an approximately 2% decrease in muscle strength by quantitative muscle testing (QMT) per year.

The most extensive dataset on disease progression is a study of 223 Japanese patients where milestones in nine activities of daily living (ADL) was observed for up to 20 years. Muscle weakness was first noticed in the lower extremities (71%), upper extremities in (31%), bulbar symptoms (11%), and facial weakness (2%), with some patients observing initial muscle weakness simultaneously in two locations. Hand tremor was noticed first (median age: 33 years), followed by muscular weakness (median = 44 years), need for handrail to ascend stairs (49 years), dysarthria (50 years), dysphagia (54 years), use of a cane (59 years), and wheelchair use (61 years). Twenty-one patients developed pneumonia (median age: 62 years) and 15 of them died (median = 65 years). The most common cause of death in these cases was pneumonia and respiratory failure. There was considerable variation in the age of onset for each milestone, often varying by 25 to 30 years between the 10th to 90th percentile ranges. The ages at onset of each ADL milestone were strongly correlated with the length of CAG repeats in the AR gene. However CAG-repeat length did not correlate with the time intervals between each ADL milestone, suggesting that the rate of disease progression does not correlate with CAG-repeat length. The average time interval between muscle weakness and handrail use was 5–6 years, between weakness and cane use was 9–11 years, between weakness and wheelchair use was 12–13 years, and between weakness and death was 10–20 years.

== Mechanism ==
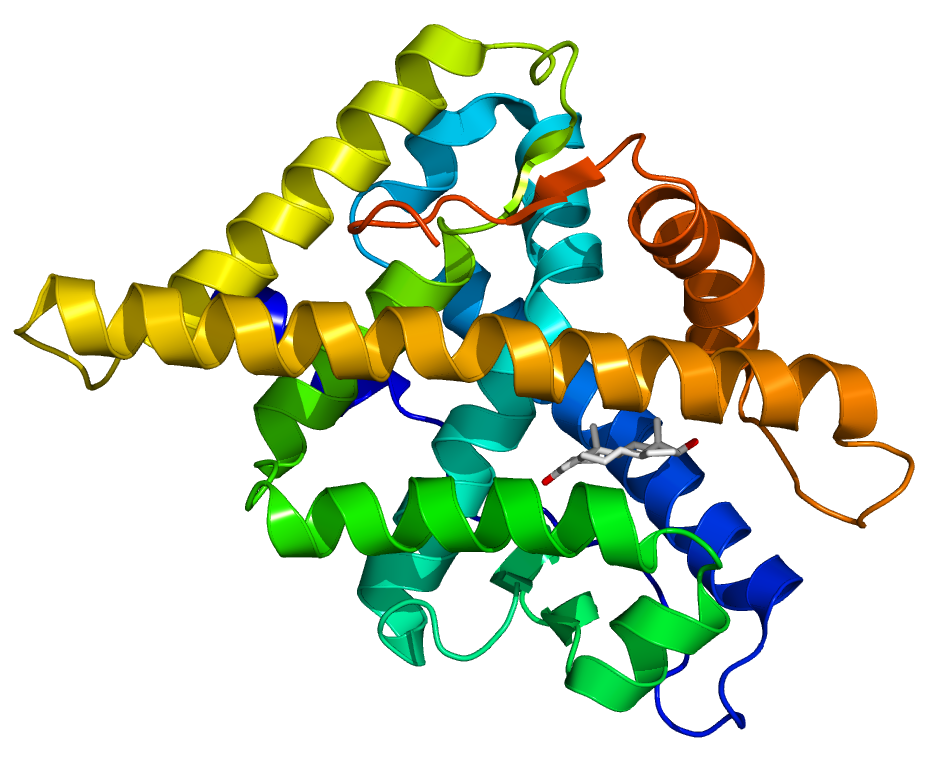
Androgen receptor

=== Molecular mechanism ===
SBMA is caused by a trinucleotide repeat expansion in the first exon of the androgen receptor (AR) gene. The AR gene, located in the X chromosome, contains a CAG repeat that encodes a polyglutamine tract in the androgen receptor protein. The tract normally varies from about 11 to 33 repeats; however, in SBMA patients, the tract contains 38 to 68 CAG repeats. The expanded series of CAG repeats in SBMA results in production of a toxic androgen receptor protein with an expanded polyglutamine tract called polyQ-AR. The repeat expansion likely causes a toxic gain of function in the receptor protein, since loss of receptor function in androgen insensitivity syndrome does not cause motor neuron degeneration.

Multiple studies have demonstrated that in SBMA, CAG repeat length inversely correlates with the age of symptom onset, but not with the rate of disease progression. Individuals with longer CAG expansions reach ADL milestones earlier (handrail, cane, wheelchair, death) and eventually develop more severe disease manifestations. CAG repeat numbers account for about 60% of the observed variation in motor disability, indicating other factors may play important roles disease progression.

The mechanisms which lead to neurodegeneration in SBMA are not fully understood. In SBMA, polyQ-AR misfolds and aggregates, leading to formation of nuclear inclusions (NIs) and diffuse accumulation of AR in the nucleus. This aggregation of the mutant protein is dependent on the presence of testosterone, the ligand for the androgen receptor. Female carriers of SBMA express polyQ-AR are generally asymptomatic or manifest only mild symptoms, due to lower levels of testosterone. Similarly, in animal models of SBMA castration dramatically reduces disease phenotype. Toxicity is believed to occur through multiple cellular mechanisms including transcriptional dysregulation, mitochondrial dysfunction, disruption of protein homeostasis and cellular signaling pathways, as well as autophagy.

SBMA is member of a group of diseases caused by polyglutamine expansion, including Huntington's disease and six types of spinocerebellar ataxia. Common characteristics of polyglutamine (or polyQ) diseases is the accumulation of polyQ proteins and the progressive degeneration of nerve cells, usually affecting people later in life. However different polyQ-containing proteins damage different subsets of neurons, leading to different symptoms.

=== Role of skeletal muscle in disease pathophysiology ===
SBMA has traditionally been considered primarily a disease of the motor neuron. Motor neurons degeneration is seen in the anterior horn of the spinal cord and brainstem, and electrophysiology studies show evidence of motor neuron dysfunction. However, several studies have suggested skeletal muscle plays an important role in SBMA pathophysiology. Myogenic abnormalities in patient muscle include atrophic and morphologically abnormal muscle fibers, fiber-type grouping, and centralized nuclei. Serum creatine kinase (CK) levels are much higher than would be expected for a purely neurogenic disease.

In animal studies, mice which express the polyglutamine androgen receptor in all tissues were shown to develop progressive neuromuscular degeneration mimicking SBMA. However, when the mice were genetically manipulated to express the protein in all tissues except skeletal muscle, muscle atrophy, neuromuscular degeneration, and survival were significantly improved. Further, treatment of mouse models of SBMA with antisense oligonucleotides targeting the polyglutamine androgen receptor reduced disease burden when administered subcutaneously though they could not cross the blood brain barrier. However, when administered intrathecally into the CNS, disease was not rescued.

Inheritance patterns in SBMA

=== Inheritance ===
SBMA is a hereditary syndrome, inherited in an X-linked recessive manner. It is transmitted to offspring through the expanded (mutant) CAG repeat in the AR gene of the X chromosome. If the person with the mutant AR gene is a father, he cannot pass the gene on to his sons. However, he will pass the mutant gene on to all daughters. If the person with the mutant gene is female, she is a carrier. With a carrier, there is a 50% chance that the mutant gene will be passed to any offspring, male or female.

Genetic founder effects are likely to be responsible for the higher prevalence of SBMA observed in certain geographic regions.

== Diagnosis ==
Diagnosis of SBMA is established by genetic testing that identifies a CAG trinucleotide repeat expansion in the AR gene. If more than 38 CAG repeats are identified, it is usually considered confirmatory of SBMA. However, there is evidence for reduced penetrance with 36–37 CAG repeats.

== Management ==
There is no known cure for SBMA. Supportive care is focused on preventing disease complications (falls, fractures, aspiration) and maintaining independence. Early interventions include occupational therapy to maintain mobility and activities of daily living. Common mobility aids include canes, mobility scooters, power wheelchairs, ramps, and stair lifts. As the disease progresses, swallowing difficulties (dysphagia) become more common and patients are at increased risk of aspiration pneumonia. Swallowing interventions include dietary modifications (adjust food texture and consistency), postural techniques, and swallowing maneuvers. Respiratory therapy may be helpful to reduce respiratory tract infections and mobilize phlegm.

=== Exercise ===
Exercise has been shown to provide a variety of benefits in several neuromuscular diseases. However, in SBMA patients, exercise can have both positive and negative impacts. In a study with 8 SBMA patients, moderate-intensity exercise was not well tolerated, and exercise frequency was decreased prior to the end of the training program. Levels of creatine kinase (CK), a biomarker of muscle degeneration, were found to increase during intense exercise, indicating primary myopathy. In a study of home-based functional exercise with 50 SBMA patients, both the low-intensity exercise and stretching control groups tolerated exercise well, but there was no significant difference in primary and secondary outcomes between the two groups. However, subgroup analysis did show benefit for a low-functioning group, suggesting there may be a role for exercise in these patients. In a third study, high-intensity interval training (HIIT) for less than one hour per week, improved both VO2max and performed workload, without increasing CK levels, self-rated fatigue and pain. Overall, these results suggest that exercise programs should be individually tailored, and SBMA patients must be carefully monitored for maladaptive biomarkers (increasing CK levels) to prevent muscle damage and worsening of disease phenotypes.

== History ==
SBMA was first described in Japanese literature in 1897 by Hiroshi Kawahara in a case report detailing progressive bulbar palsy in two brothers. Information on the clinical course, X-linked inheritance patterns, and key pathologic features was later documented by William R. Kennedy in 1968. Onset of disease in mid-life and lack of symptoms in heterozygous female carriers was further described by Anita Harding in 1982. In 1986, the causative gene of SBMA was shown to be present on the proximal arm of the X chromosome by Kurt Fischbeck, though the exact gene causing SBMA had not yet been characterized. In 1991, it was discovered that the AR gene is involved in the disease process, and that expansion of a CAG repeat in the AR gene causes disease.

== Research directions ==
Research in SBMA is broad, and covers a number of aspects of the disorder. Below is a summary of a few areas of ongoing research in SBMA:

=== Aggregation ===
The polyglutamine androgen receptor does not fold properly, and subsequently forms protein aggregates with other proteins. This is a gain of new function conferred by the polyglutamine tract, as the non-polyglutamine expanded androgen receptor does not form these aggregates. Several proteins key to normal cellular function have been found to be sequestered within these aggregates, including CREB-BP, Hsp70, Hsp40, and components of the ubiquitin proteasome system. It is thought that loss of sufficient supply of these and other key proteins contributes to the pathogenesis of the disease, though further research is ongoing.

=== Post-translational modifications ===
Following its transcription and translation, the androgen receptor is modified with a number of post-translational modifications, including phosphorylation, methylation, acetylation, and SUMOylation. The polyglutamine androgen receptor has been found to have different levels of some these post-translational modifications. Further, altering the levels of certain post-translational modifications of the mutant androgen receptor has altered the degree of toxicity in cellular and animal models, suggesting they may be a target for further research and therapeutic development.

=== Clinical trials ===
==== Leuprorelin ====
Leuprorelin, a GnRH agonist which blocks the synthesis of testosterone when given continuously, was initially shown to be effective at improving motor function in mouse models of SBMA. A small pilot study was performed in which five SBMA patients were given subcutaneous injections of leuprorelin every four weeks for six months, with serial scrotal skin biopsies performed. Nuclear accumulation of polyglutamine androgen receptor was significantly reduced in patient scrotal biopsies. Additionally, serum CK, a marker of muscle deterioration, and testosterone levels were both reduced in patients receiving leuprorelin. Notably, in this study patients were not randomized to treatment groups or placebo controlled.

A subsequent larger study consisted of fifty SBMA patients randomized to either leuprorelin treatment or placebo. This trial spanned 48 weeks of treatment with treatment occurring every four weeks initially. Following treatment, thirty-four patients had an open-label follow-up spanning an additional ninety-six weeks with treatment continuing every twelve weeks. At the forty-eight week mark, there was no significant difference in the ALS functional rating scale, the primary outcome measure of the study, between placebo and leuprorelin treated groups. There was improvement in swallowing a barium contrast marker, a secondary endpoint of the study, at forty-eight weeks. Further, there was improvement in the ALS functional rating scale at the 96 and 144 week marks, suggesting a longer period may be needed to see effects of leuprorelin.

A larger, multi-center, placebo-controlled, double blind study was then conducted which contained 199 SBMA patients who were randomized to either placebo or leuprorelin treatment. The study spanned forty-eight weeks with leuprorelin treatment every 12 weeks, with ability to swallow a barium contrast marker as the primary endpoint. In this study, there was not a significant difference in barium swallow at forty-eight weeks. There was also no difference in other video fluorography measurements, supporting the lack of improvement in swallow function in the treatment group. Other secondary measures, such as number of AR positive scrotal cells and serum CK level were significantly different in the treatment group. Though the primary endpoint of the study did not show an effect of leuprorelin on SBMA patients, a subgroup analysis performed on patients who had symptoms for ten years or less did show improved swallowing function, and it was suggested that treatment may be more effective in patients who have shown symptoms for shorter periods of time or with less advanced disease.

A recent follow-up open-label study compared thirty-six patients treated with leuprorelin to nontreated controls over eighty four months, and found that the treated group showed slower decline in motor function than the non-treated group. Significantly differing endpoints of this study included the ALS Functional Rating Scale, the Limb Norris Score, and the Norris Bulbar Score.

==== Dutasteride ====
Dutasteride is a 5α-reductase inhibitor which blocks the conversion of testosterone into dihydrotestosterone, reducing overall androgen receptor activation. Fifty patients were recruited to a randomized, placebo controlled trial spanning two years, with a primary endpoint of quantitative muscle assessment. No significant difference was found in quantitative muscle assessment between the placebo and dutasteride groups at the two year mark. Secondary outcomes including barium swallow and manual muscle testing also showed no significant difference between groups.

==== BVS857 ====
IGF-1, a signaling molecule downstream of growth hormone, has well established functions promoting skeletal muscle growth. In preclinical studies on mouse models of amyotrophic lateral sclerosis, IGF-1 was shown to be protective against motor neuron death. A double blind, placebo-controlled clinical trial was performed with eighteen SBMA patients receiving BVS857, a mimetic of IGF-1, with nine placebo controls. The study found increased thigh muscle volume improved lean body mass following 12 weeks of treatment in the BVS857 group compared to placebo. However, eleven of eighteen patients were found to have an immune response against BVS857, with five patients developing neutralizing antibodies, posing a challenge for long-term treatment.

== Society and culture ==
In 2000, the Kennedy's Disease Association was founded by Susanne and Terry Waite and Patrick Griffin to help find effective treatments and a cure for SBMA. The organization is managed and operated by an all-volunteer board of directors, and grown to over 1,600 associates from over 50 countries. Donations from patients and families provide funding to support research (90%), education (5%) and operating expenses (5%). KDA has awarded grants and fellowships to researchers in the United States, Canada, Britain, Italy, and Japan to support both basic research and clinical trials on the causes and potential treatments for SBMA. The KDA website states that they focus on providing "seed-money" to post-doc and other young researchers to start working on SBMA, collecting preliminary data that can be used to support larger proposals to governmental and philanthropic organizations. In 2022, the KDA Waite-Griffin Fellowship was established to encourage young researchers to include research on SBMA in their future career plans.

== See also ==
- Spinal muscular atrophies
