= Protruding ear =

Abnormally prominent human ear

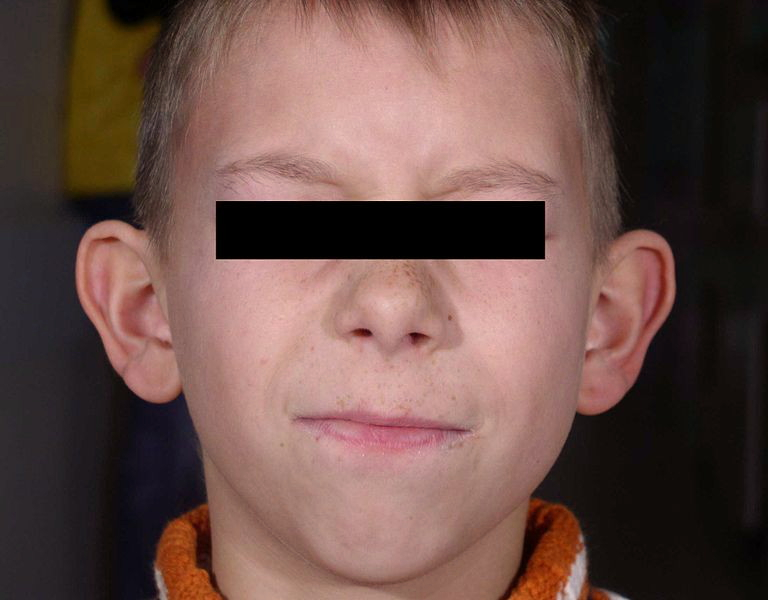
Boy with otapostasis

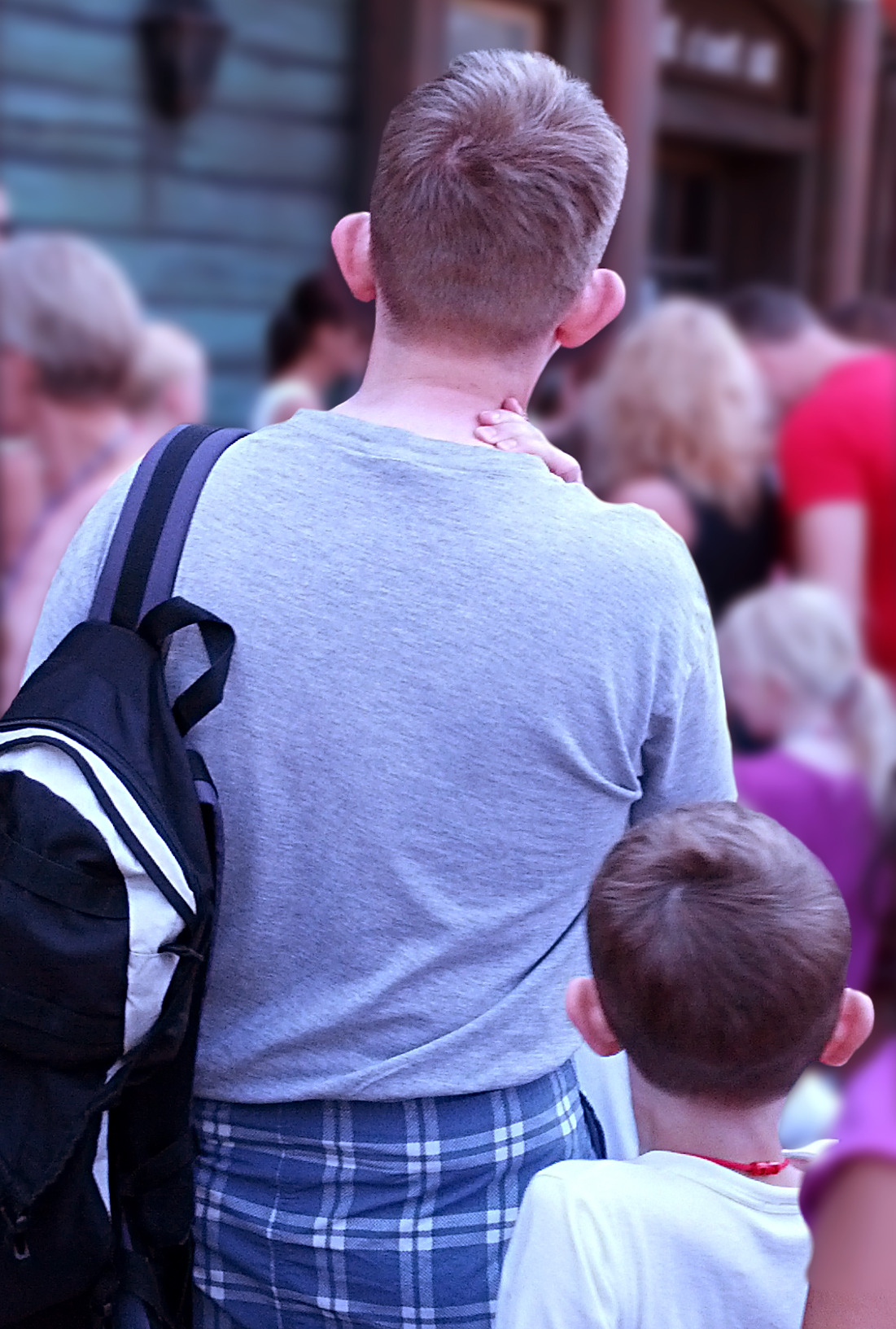
Father and son with otapostasis

Protruding ear, otapostasis or bat ear is an abnormally prominent human ear. It may be unilateral or bilateral. The concha is large with poorly developed antihelix and scapha. It is the result of malformation of cartilage during primitive ear development in intrauterine life. The deformity can be corrected anytime after five years of age. The surgery is preferably done at the earliest possible age in order to avoid psychological distress. Correction by otoplasty involves changing the shape of the ear cartilage so that the ear is brought closer to the side of the head. The skin is not removed, but the shape of the cartilage is altered. The surgery does not affect hearing. It is done for cosmetic purposes only. The complications of the surgery, though rare, are keloid formation, hematoma formation, infection and asymmetry between the ears.

== See also ==
- Cauliflower ear
- Incisionless Fritsch otoplasty
