= Anticipation (genetics) =

Phenomenon on genetic disorder symptoms

In genetics, anticipation is a phenomenon whereby as a genetic disorder is passed on to the next generation, the symptoms of the genetic disorder become apparent at an earlier age with each generation. In most cases, an increase in the severity of symptoms is also noted. Anticipation is common in trinucleotide repeat disorders, such as Huntington's disease and myotonic dystrophy, where a dynamic mutation in DNA occurs. All of these diseases have neurological symptoms. Prior to the understanding of the genetic mechanism for anticipation, it was debated whether anticipation was a true biological phenomenon or whether the earlier age of diagnosis was related to heightened awareness of disease symptoms within a family.

== Trinucleotide repeats and expansion ==
Trinucleotide repeats are apparent in a number of loci in the human genome. They have been found in introns, exons and 5' or 3' UTR's. They consist of a pattern of three nucleotides (e.g. CGG) which is repeated a number of times. During meiosis, unstable repeats can undergo triplet expansion (see later section); in this case, the germ cells produced have a greater number of repeats than are found in the somatic tissues.

The mechanism behind the expansion of the triplet repeats is not well understood. One hypothesis is that the increasing number of repeats influences the overall shape of the DNA, which can have an effect on its interaction with DNA polymerase and thus the expression of the gene.

== Disease mechanisms ==
For many of the loci, trinucleotide expansion is harmless, but in some areas expansion has detrimental effects that cause symptoms. When the trinucleotide repeat is present within the protein-coding region, the repeat expansion leads to production of a mutant protein with gain of function. This is the case for Huntington's disease, where the trinucleotide repeat encodes a long stretch of glutamine residues. When the repeat is present in an untranslated region, it could affect the expression of the gene in which the repeat is found (ex. fragile X) or many genes through a dominant negative effect (ex. myotonic dystrophy).

In order to have a deleterious effect, the number of repeats must cross a certain threshold. For example, normal individuals have between 5 and 30 CTG repeats within the 3' UTR of DMPK, the gene that is altered in myotonic dystrophy. If the number of repeats is between 50 and 100, the person is only mildly affected – perhaps having only cataracts. However, meiotic instability could result in a dynamic mutation that increases the number of repeats in offspring inheriting the mutant allele. Once the number of copies reaches over 100, the disease will manifest earlier in life (although the individual will still reach adulthood before the symptoms are evident) and the symptoms will be more severe – including electrical myotonia. As the number progresses upwards past 400, the symptoms show themselves during childhood or infancy.

== Examples of diseases showing anticipation ==
Diseases showing anticipation include:

- Autosomal dominant
  - Several spinocerebellar ataxias
  - Huntington's disease – CAG
  - Myotonic dystrophy – CTG
  - Dyskeratosis congenita – TTAGGG (telomere repeat sequence)
- Autosomal recessive
  - Friedreich ataxia – GAA (Note: Friedreich ataxia does not usually exhibit anticipation because it is an autosomal recessive disorder.)
- X-linked
  - Fragile X syndrome – CGG
- Without expression type
  - Crohn's disease
  - Behçet's disease
