= Ataxin =

Type of nuclear protein

Ataxin is a type of nuclear protein. The class is called ataxin because mutated forms of these proteins and their corresponding genes were found to cause progressive ataxia.

Some examples, their coding genes and associated diseases include:

- Ataxin 1, coded by ATXN1. Mutants of ataxin 1 with a polyglutamine expansion cause SCA1.
- Ataxin 2, coded by ATXN2. It is known to cause SCA2 with polyglutamine expansion.
- Ataxin 3, coded by ATXN3. Machado-Joseph disease is caused by polyglutamine expansions in ataxin 3.
- Ataxin 7, coded by ATXN7. Polyglutamine expansions in Ataxin 7 cause SCA7.
- Ataxin 8, coded by ATXN8. Ataxin 8 does not cause an ataxic order, but a gene on the opposite strand, ATXN8OS, causes Spinocerebellar ataxia type 8 with CTG expansion.
- Ataxin 10, coded by ATXN10. It is associated with the pentanucleotide disorder, SCA10.
- Frataxin, follows a similar naming convention and is coded by the FXN gene. GAA repeat expansions in a non-coding region of FXN cause Friedreich's ataxia when both copies of the gene are affected.

Gene:

The ataxin genes can be found on numerous chromosomes

- Ataxin1 on Chromosome 6 band 22
- Ataxin2 on Chromosome 12 band 24
- Ataxin3 on Chromosome 14 band 32
- Ataxin7 on Chromosome 3 band 21
- Ataxin on 8 on Chromosome 13 band 21
- Ataxin10 on chromosome 22 band 13.32
- Ataxin1 on Chromosome 6 band 22

Species, Tissues, Subcellular Distribution:

Ataxin genes have been seen in a wide variety of vertebrates from protein-containing humans, mice, and flies. Across tested species, the Ataxin gene has been found in the cytoplasm, cytosol, nuclear inclusions, nuclear matrix, nucleolus, and nucleoplasm. These genes are seen to be active in the nucleus and parts of protein-containing complexes

Function:

The function of the Ataxin gene exists in a wide variety of vertebrates, including humans, and is largely unknown due to gaps in research and to its developmentally regulated expression early in development. However, when tested in rats the loss of Ataxin gene function showed no significant difference or SCA phenotypes leading scientists to hypothesize that ATAXIN mutations do not result in a loss of function protein, but a functional gain that has negative effects. Functional wildtype Ataxin genes have been shown to enable DNA, POZ, RNA, chromatin, identical protein, Poly U RNA, and protein binding, as well as be involved in RNA processing, brain development, learning, memory, negative and non negative DNA transcription regulation, negative regulation of transcription, nuclear export, and social behavior.

Clinical Significance:

Autosomal dominant genetic disorder can be caused by both heterozygous and homozygous ataxin gene variants.This is due to the length of G repetition chains that lead to abnormally long polyglutamine causing mis folding of expressed protein and interacting proteins such as those of the plasma membrane leading to destabilizing effects leading to diseased phenotypes. The length of these polyglutamine chains have shown correlation to earlier onset and worsening phenotypes.

Numerous Spinocerebellar ataxia or SCA’s can be caused by numerous genes including Ataxin genes. Spinocerebella ataxia is a group of genetic brain disorders that affects the cerebellum and in turn coordination of physical movement, and spinal cord. Spinocerebellar ataxia conditions worsen over time and can negatively affect eyes, hands, legs, speech, and mobility. There are over 40 types of SCA due to mutations in Ataxin genes, specifically Ataxin 1, 2, 3, 4, and 6. These Ataxin caused SCA can affect 1-5 in 100,000 people.

SCA’s present as gait ataxia often in combination with dysarthria and oculomotor problems. Other common symptoms include pyramidal and extrapyramidal signs along with intellectual impairment.

History:

Ataxin genes and the pathology understanding of the genes' effects started over 25 years ago and has had numerous breakthroughs since. Holmes and Greenfield first started categorizing Ataxia through neurological pathways and the Ataxin Gene that give rise to Ataxia.

Since then Ataxin genes have been further observed and in 2022 a group of researchers won the Kavli Prize in Neuroscience on a study of Ataxin. This study identified genes of underlying diseases and novel pathways of diagnosis and treatment for spinocerebellar ataxia type 1. Huda Zoghbi and Harry Orr from the prize winning team independently discovered the ATAXIN1 gene causes spinocerebellar ataxia type 1. SCA is a mutation causing repetition of a CAG trinucleotide sequence where the length of respiration affects age of onset that causes loss of balance and coordination. Zoghbi and Orr also discovered the function ataxin-1; encoding DNA binding proteins that forms a large protein aggregate in cerebellar neurons which is why mutations will lead to degeneration. They also showed that oligonucleotide therapy improves symptoms in mice models.

Future research of Ataxin gene based Ataxia disorder hopes to discover new target drugs, gene silencing, genetic testing, and fixation of disturbed neural activity pathways to contribute to growing medical treatments and therapies.

Ataxin 1:

Ataxin 1 is found on chromosome 6 at band 22 with exon count of 11. Ataxin1 is often shorthanded to ATX1, SCA1, or D6S504E. ATX1 is more often expressed in nucleus, neurons, Purkinje cells, but can also be located in heart, brain, lungs, and kidneys of human fetal tissues.

There have been seven ClinGen verified pathogenic variants of ATX1 leading to deceased phenotypes. A common ATX1 variant lead disease is autosomal dominant disease spinocerebellar ataxia type 1, SCA1 or OMIM 164400. The ATX1 mutation that causes SCA1 is due to a CAG trinucleotide repeat expansion within exon 8 of the ATX1 gene. The repeat expansions are within the coding region of the gene causing a glutamine to be coded (CAG). As the protein is expressed repeated glutamines are added to the protein structure. It is shown that the number of glutamine repeats results in earlier onset in affected individuals and increasing severity of disease phenotypes with average length of glutamine repeat variability being 6-44 glutamines long.

SCA1 affects 2 in 100,000 people with diagnosis occurring from ages of 7 - 74 years olds and a life expectancy of 10-30 years post onset. For SCA1 there are currently no disease-modifying treatments, but multiple therapies used to improve quality of life for affected individuals. These therapies include physiotherapy, occupational therapy, and speech therapy that target symptoms of SCA1. Research into disease target treatments are currently under research with strategies such as stem cell injections in mouse models, drugs that can penetrate the blood brain barrier without further harming the patient and biomarker testing to treat disease before onset or prevent inheritance of SCA1.

Ataxin 2:

ATXN2 is a part of the like-Sm protein family that participates heavily in RNA processing and metabolism. ATXN2 has two LSm associated domains. These domains relate to ATXN2 gene conserved from yeast pointing to an evolutionary need for the ATXN2 gene. The LSM domains downstream of the N-terminous of ATXN2 are important for RNA processing, modifications, pre-mRNA splicing, and mRNA decay and separation.

Ataxin 2 genes major functions are in RNA processing, control, and stability. Variants of the Ataxin 2 gene can give rise to Spinocerebellar Ataxia Type 2 (SCA2). Trinucleotide repeats of CAG interrupted by a CAA that gives rise to a polyQ tract usually around 22-23 glutamines, but when Ataxin2 is mutated by a variant the polyQ tract can consist of 34 or more Glutamines (Qs) causing SCA2. SCA2 is usually related to early onset, but in rare cases late onset has been seen in individuals with smaller polyQ tracts. The ATXN2 polyQ tract is also associated with autosomal-dominant Parkinson’s disease and amyotrophic lateral sclerosis (ALS). Outside of neurological disorders ATXN2 is also associated with breast, gastric, pancreatic, colon and esophageal cancer.

Ataxin 3:

The Ataxin 3 gene was originally cloned by Kawaguchi who discovered the expanding polyQ tact due to CAG repeats in the ATaxin3 gene. Ataxin 3 in its wildtype state includes 11 exons, which codes for a roughly 42kDA large disease protein. The CAG repeat common in Ataxin 3 gene variants in exon 10 causes expansion and increase in molecular weight, with 20 different ATXN3 protein coding mRNAs found due to splicing alternatives.

Ataxin 3 or ATXN3 gene when mutated can lead to spinobulbar muscular atrophy, Huntington's disease, dentatorubral-pallidoluysian atrophy and the autosomal dominant inherited spinocerebellar ataxia 3 (SCA3) caused by unstable CAG expansion mutation leading to expanded polyQ tracts and triggers a pathogenic chain reaction leading to numerous disease, but the exact pathways of ATXN 3 gene to disease is largely unknown. Methylation of DNA has been detected in several neurodegenerative diseases including SCA3. The methylation of SCA3 promoter is hypothesized to influence progression of SCA3 in patients, but how DNA methylation contributes to SCA3 translations is unknown. DNA Methylation of ATXN3 promoter has been seen, but correlation between ATXN3 mRNA and hypermethylation have been observed.

ATXN3 is characterized by a promotor, Sp1 and CCAAT motif binding factor (CBF) that binds in vitro using electric mobility shift assays (EMSA). ATXN3 expression can be post-transcriptionally regulated with miRNAs such as miR-181, miR-9, and miR-494 that are shown to bind to the 3’ untranslated region of ATXN3.
