= Autosomal dominant cerebellar ataxia =

- Other names: Autosomal dominant spinocerebellar ataxia
- Autosomal dominant is the manner in which this condition is inherited
- Symptoms: Multi system involvement
- Types: ADCS type1, ADCA type 2, ADCA type 3
- Diagnostic method: MRI, CT scan
- Treatment: Anticonvulsants may be used

Autosomal dominant cerebellar ataxia (ADCA) is a form of spinocerebellar ataxia inherited in an autosomal dominant manner. ADCA is a genetically inherited condition that causes deterioration of the nervous system leading to disorder and a decrease or loss of function to regions of the body.

Degeneration occurs at the cellular level and in certain subtypes results in cellular death. Cellular death or dysfunction causes a break or faulty signal in the line of communication from the central nervous system to target muscles in the body. When there is impaired communication or a lack of communication entirely, the muscles in the body do not function correctly. Muscle control complications can be observed in multiple balance, speech, and motor or movement impairment symptoms. ADCA is divided into three types and further subdivided into subtypes known as SCAs (spinocerebellar ataxias).

== Types ==
Currently there are 27 subtypes that have been identified: SCA1-SCA4, SCA8, SCA10, SCA12-SCA14, SCA15/SCA16, SCA17-SCA23, SCA25, SCA27, SCA28, SCA32, SCA34-SCA37, autosomal dominant cerebellar ataxia and dentatorubral pallidoluysian atrophy.

=== Type 1 ===
Type I ADCA is characterized by different symptoms of ataxia as well as other conditions that are dependent on the subtype. Type 1 ADCA is divided into 3 subclasses based on the pathogenesis of the subtypes each contain.

L-Glutamine

- Subclass 1 – subtypes in the first subclass are caused by CAG nucleotide repeats in the DNA, which code for the amino acid glutamine. Having an excessive number of glutamine repeats is thought to cause toxic effects on the cell at the level of proteins, which leads to degenerative symptoms. Within this subclass are subtypes SCA1, SCA2, SCA3, SCA17, and DRPLA. This first subclass is the most common of Type 1 ADCAs with SCA3 being the most common subtype of all of Type 1. SCA3, also called Machado-Joseph disease, involves mutation repeats with length greater than 56 times while the regular length is around 13 to 31.
- Subclass 2 – the second subclass of Type 1 ADCA is also caused by 3-nucleotide repeats but instead happens in the part of the DNA which is translated into RNA but not transcribed into proteins. Damage to neurons is thought to be caused by toxic effects from the RNA interfering with Gene expression. Subclass 2 includes the subtypes SCA8, SCA10, and SCA12.
- Subclass 3 – the third subclass of Type 1 ADCA is caused by other types of mutations, such as missense mutations, nonsense mutations, or full gene deletions. It includes subtypes SCA13, SCA14, SCA15/16, SCA27, and SCA28.

=== Type 2/3 ===
Type II ADCA is composed of SCA7 and syndromes associated with pigmentary maculopathies. SCA7 is a disease that specifically displays retinal degeneration, along with the common degeneration of the cerebellum. Moving further into SCA7's pathology, a similar genetic process is described, while the function of ATXN7 (an ataxin gene) is much like a component of the SAGA complex. The SAGA complex uses two histone-modifying techniques to regulate transcription. These activities are the Gcn5 histone acetyltransferase and the Usp22 deubiquitinase. Mutant ATXN7 in HAT activity causes an increase in activity, which was reported from an in-vivo analysis in the retina. There are also studies that show a loss in activity when human ATXN7 in yeast was used. The SCA7 autosomal-dominant inheritance pattern is similar to a mutant ATXN5-induced gain in Gcn5 HAT. Spinocerebellar ataxia type 15 has been classified as an ADCA Type III as it has been noted to have postural and action tremor in addition to cerebellar ataxia. Additionally, spinocerebellar ataxia type 20 (SCA20) is organized in ADCA III that often exhibits disease-like symptoms at an earlier age, sometime starting at fourteen years old.

== Symptoms and signs ==
Cerebellum

Symptoms typically are onset in the adult years, although, childhood cases have also been observed. Common symptoms include a loss of coordination which is often seen in walking, and slurred speech. ADCA primarily affects the cerebellum, as well as, the spinal cord. Some signs and symptoms are:

- Episodes of altered level of consciousness
- Neurological regression
- Multi-system involvement
- Movement disorders.
- Cerebellar dysfunction

== Genetics ==
In terms of the genetics of autosomal dominant cerebellar ataxia 11 of 18 known genes are caused by repeated expansions in corresponding proteins, sharing the same mutational mechanism. SCAs can be caused by conventional mutations or large rearrangements in genes that make glutamate and calcium signaling, channel function, tau regulation and mitochondrial activity or RNA alteration.The mechanism of Type I is not completely known, however, Whaley, et al. suggest the polyglutamine product is toxic to the cell at a protein level, this effect may be done by transcriptional dysregulation and disruption of calcium homeostasis which causes apoptosis to occur earlier.

== Diagnosis ==
In diagnosing autosomal dominant cerebellar ataxia the individuals clinical history or their past health examinations, a current physical examination to check for any physical abnormalities, and a genetic screening of the patients genes and the genealogy of the family are done. The large category of cerebellar ataxia is caused by a deterioration of neurons in the cerebellum, therefore magnetic resonance imaging (MRI) is used to detect any structural abnormality such as lesions which are the primary cause of the ataxia. Computed tomography (CT) scans can also be used to view neuronal deterioration, but the MRI provides a more accurate and detailed picture.

== Treatments ==
In terms of a cure there is currently none available, however for the disease to manifest itself, it requires mutant gene expression. Manipulating the use of protein homeostasis regulators can be therapeutic agents, or a treatment to try and correct an altered function that makes up the pathology is one current idea put forth by Bushart, et al. There is some evidence that for SCA1 and two other polyQ disorders that the pathology can be reversed after the disease is underway.

== Epidemiology ==
In terms of frequency, it is estimated at 2 per 100,000, it has identified in different regions of the world. Some clusters of certain types of autosomal dominant cerebellar ataxia reach a prevalence of 5 per 100,000.
