= Spinocerebellar ataxia type 7 =

Rare neurodegenerative disorder

- Other names: Olivopontocerebellar Atrophy Type III (OPCA3), Autosomal dominant cerebellar ataxia type II (ADCA, type II).
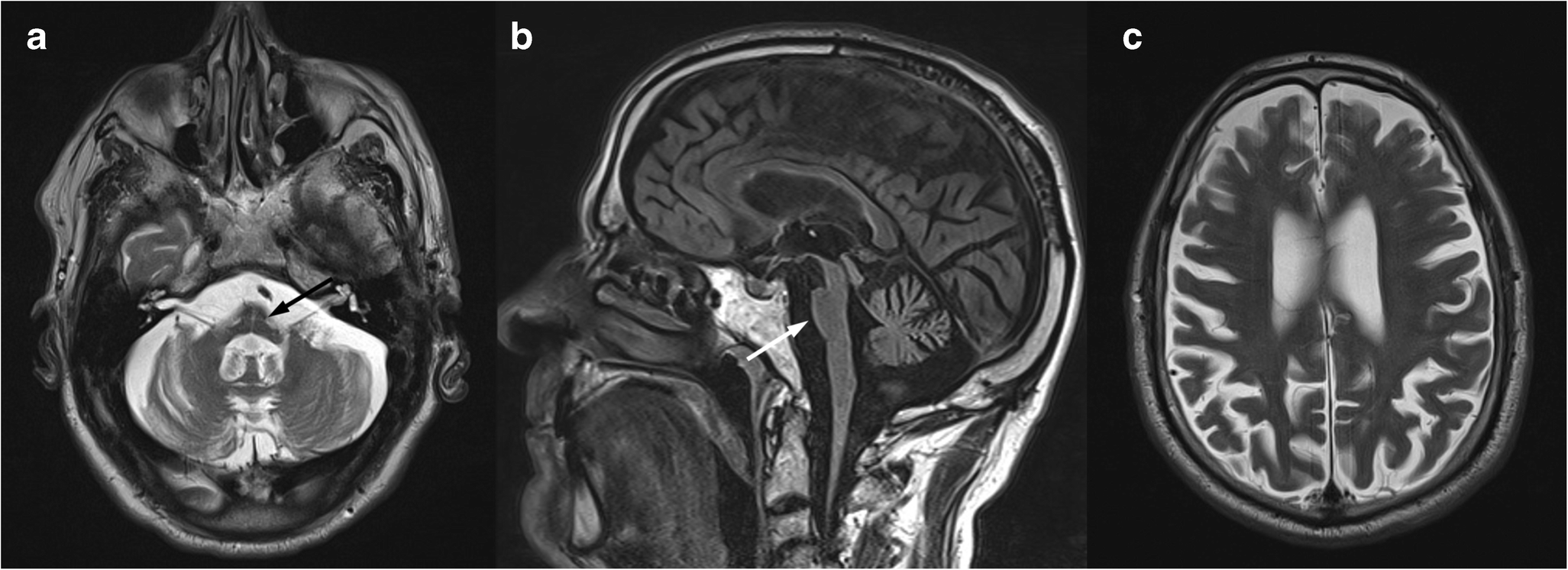
- Brain MRI of the patient with SCA7. in Fig.A (Axial T2) aand Fig.B (Sagittal T1), a global cerebellar and pontine atrophy can be seen. In Fig.C supratentorial gray matter volume loss can be seen.
- Specialty: Neurology
- Symptoms: Ataxia, pyramidal signs, cone-rod dystrophy.
- Usual onset: Usually 20 to 40 years of age
- Duration: 20-30 years
- Causes: CAG expansion in ATXN7 gene
- Prevention: Genetic counseling
- Treatment: Symptomatic

Spinocerebellar ataxia type 7 (SCA7) is a rare genetic (autosomal dominant) disorder caused by a CAG nucleotide expansion in a gene ATXN7. This disorder belongs to polyglutamine disorders due to elongation of the polyglutamine tract. Symptoms usually begin between 20 and 40 years of age, and usual symptoms include ataxia, dysarthric speech, slow saccadic eye movements, pyramidal signs, difficulty swallowing, opthalmoplegia, and cone-rod dystrophy which can progress into blindness; it is one of the distinctive signs of this disorder. Duration is usually 20 to 30 years, but varies with age of onset.

Prevalence of this disorder is less than 1:300 000, also this disorder represented 2% of the SCA cases; over 1000 individuals with SCA7 have been reported. SCA7 usually can be seen in Scandinavia, Africa, and Mexico, due to founder effect.

== Symptoms ==
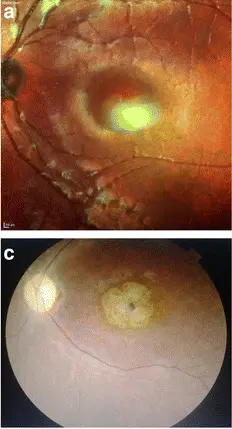
Fundus (rear eye) photography of patients with SCA7. Macular degeneration can be seen.

In SCA7 patients, cerebellar ataxia is usually the first sign, but in some cases, visual impairment or both may also be the first sign (it correlates with CAG expansion size). Patients usually experience gait ataxia, dysmetria of limbs, dysarthria, intentional tremor, and dysdiadochokinesia, slow saccade (which is caused by pons degeneration), macular problems; also pyramidal signs can be seen, such as hyperreflexia of limbs and spasticity. Some patients can also experience ophthalmoplegia, nystagmus, snoring, inability to fall asleep; autonomic disturbances such as gastrointestinal and urinary issues (both of them are common), rarely they have issues with thermoregulation. In much rare cases restless leg syndrome. Visual loss starts as a loss of color perception (specifically tritan, which is caused by cones dysfunction), which then progresses to blindness. Patient usually have spared cognition.

=== Infantile-onset and juvenile-onset ===
Patients with infantile-onset (which can begin at the age of 0 to 1.5) SCA7 can present with ataxia and visual impairment which is accompanied by seizures, involuntary muscle jerk, severe decrease in muscle tone, enlarged liver, heart diseases (such as persistent ductus arteriosus and heart failure). Infantile-onset SCA7 can progress rapidly and cause death in a few months or years.

In case of juvenile-onset (which can begin at the age of 1.5 to 15) patients experience the same symptoms as adults, but much faster and severe. Early-juvenile cases begin as an ataxia, and late-juvenile might begin as a visual impairment or ataxia.

== Diagnosis ==
Diagnosis of SCA7 might be suspected by its symptoms (such as cone and rod anomalies on ERG, cerebellar and brainstem deterioration); and diagnosis can be confirmed by genetic testing.

In order to confirm CAG expansions in the ATXN7 gene, conventional PCR can be used, but it cannot detect extremely expanded CAGs (especially in patients with childhood-onset); consequently, southern blot (a technique where purified DNA from tissue would be digested and separated using electric currents) analysis can be used to confirm diagnosis or PCR in combination with capillary electrophoresis (which can estimate allele size more properly).

== Cause ==
SCA7 is caused by pathogenic CAG nucleotide expansion in a gene ATXN7. Normally ATXN7 allele contains 4 to 34 repeats and patients have 37 repeats to more than 300 CAG expansions. Anticipation (a phenomenon where disorder becomes much severe and appears early as this allele passed to another generation) occurs and males with SCA7 pass more CAG expansions. HIghest repeat that was ever reported was 460.

Repeat sizes associated with SCA7
Age of onset	Allele size
Normal allele	7-27 CAG
Unstable normal allele	28-33 CAG
Reduced penetrance	34-36 CAG
Adult onset (more than 3rd decade)	<59 CAG
Adult onset (less than 3rd decade)	59-100 CAG
Childhood onset	>100 CAG
Infantile onset	200-400 CAG

== Pathophysiology ==
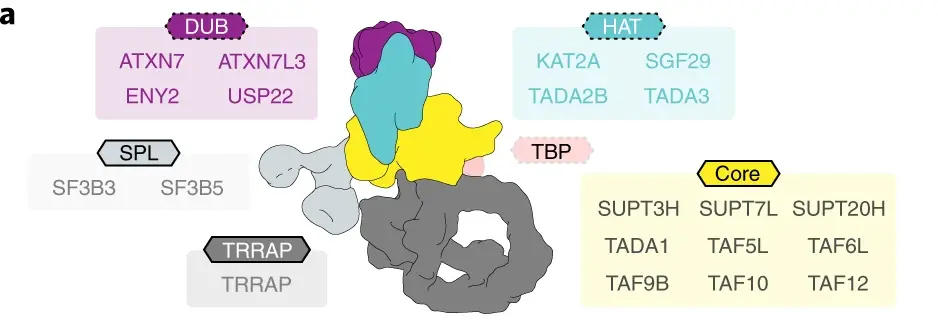
The structure of human SAGA complex, which ATXN7 is part of.

ATXN7 consists of 803 amino acids and has polyglutamine expandable region near to the N-terminus.

ATXN7 protein is a subunit of SAGA complex which is known to acetylate (to add acetate on substrate)and de-ubuqinate histone which are important for transcription. Mutated ATXN7 (mATXN7) might cause sequestration of SAGA, p53, CBP, FIP200. SAGA dysregulation might cause decreased levels of cerebellar-identity genes and decreased activity of CRX, which in turn causes photoreceptor gene expression to decrease; also p53 sequestration causes deregulation of proteins which participates in metabolic processes (such as NOX1, AIF) which causes reduction of respiratory capacity of cell which in turn decreases levels of ATP. p53 abnormally interacts with FIP200 in mATXN7 aggregates which causes reduction of FIP200 levels which destabilize ULK1 which in turn impairs autophagy. Also, mATXN7 can interact with CRX directly and consequently intrfer with its activity. mATXN7 induces dysregulation of genes which are related to DNA repair, NAD+ synthesis; consequently aberrant activation of PARP occurs and causes depletion of NAD+ which in turn decrases activity of Sirtuin 1. Sirtuin 1 normally deacetylates PGC-1α which inhibits its activity, but in SCA7, PGC-1α remains acetylated which in turn inhibits genes related calcium homeostasis (which can cause neuronal dysfunction).

SAGA complex can induce transcription of miR-124, which can regulate levels of ATXN7 mRNA. but in SCA7, miR-124 levels are decreased due to SAGA complex dysfunction (as mentioned before, caused by polyQ-expanded ATXN7) which might account for tissue-specific pathology.

== Treatment ==
Management of SCA7 is symptomatic as there is no cure. UV light should be avoided in order to preserve retinal function, and walkers can be used in order to sustain activity. Feeding tubes can be used to decrease the risk of aspiration pneumonia.

== Research ==
In 2013, researchers found that interferon beta in mice models of SCA7 could stimulate transcription of PML, which in turn can clear mATXN7 proteins and reduce symptoms. In 2014, researchers used siRNA to decrease levels of ATXN7 mRNA level in retina of mice, which preserved function of retina.

== History ==
This disorder was first described by Froment and colleagues in 1937. Benomar and colleagues mapped SCA7 to the part of the short arm of the chromosome 3 in 1995, and in 1996 David and colleagues mapped SCA7 to a specific region on chromosome 3 (3p12-p13); in 1997, it was found that CAG expansion caused this disorder. ADCA II was coined by Harding in 1993 due to the pigmentary retinopathy feature of this disorder.
