= Spinocerebellar ataxia type 13 =

- This condition is inherited in an autosomal dominant manner.
- Specialty: Neurology
- Frequency: 0.0001%

Spinocerebellar ataxia type 13 (SCA13) is a rare autosomal dominant disorder, which, like other types of SCA, is characterized by dysarthria, nystagmus, and ataxia of gait, stance and the limbs due to cerebellar dysfunction. Patients with SCA13 also tend to present with epilepsy, an inability to run, and increased reflexes. This cerebellar dysfunction is permanent and progressive. SCA13 is caused by mutations in KCNC3, a gene encoding a voltage-gated potassium channel K_{V}3.3. There are two known mutations in this gene causative for SCA13. Unlike many other types of SCA, these are not polyglutamine expansions but, rather, point mutations resulting in channels with no current or altered kinetics.

== Signs and symptoms ==
SCA13 is typified by early onset, mildly progressive cerebellar ataxia with accompanying dysarthria, mental retardation, and nystagmus. Symptoms and age of onset can vary slightly according to the causative mutation.

== Pathophysiology ==
Mutations in KCNC3 are responsible for SCA13. This gene is expressed heavily in Purkinje cells, as is the case for some other SCA subtypes, where it is believed to play an important role in facilitating high-frequency action potential firing. There are two known mutations in this gene associated with SCA13. The first mutation, R420H, is located in the voltage-sensing S4 segment of the channel. As this mutation neutralizes a site important for voltage sensing, it is not surprising that it results in non-conducting channels. Neurons expressing such channels are unable to follow high-frequency input with adequate fidelity.

The second SCA13 associated mutation, F448L, results in functional channels that have altered kinetics. The voltage for half activation of these channels (V½) is shifted 13mV hyperpolarized compared to wild-type. Deactivation of these channels is also slowed drastically compared to wild-type. This results in neurons with longer after-hyperpolarizations and thus, a decreased maximal firing rate.

== Prognosis ==
There is no known prevention of spinocerebellar ataxia. Those who are believed to be at risk can have genetic sequencing of known SCA loci performed to confirm inheritance of the disorder.
