= Ammar Al-Chalabi =

Neurologist and amyotrophic lateral sclerosis researcher

- Education: Leicester University; King's College London
- Known for: Research on amyotrophic lateral sclerosis
- Awards: Sheila Essey Award from the American Academy of Neurology (2016)
- Scientific career
- Fields: Neurology; Neuroscience
- Workplaces: King's College London
- Thesis: Genetic risk factors in amytrophic lateral sclerosis (1999)
- Academic advisors: Nigel Leigh

Ammar Al-Chalabi is Professor of Neurology and Complex Disease Genetics at the Maurice Wohl Clinical Neuroscience Institute at King's College London, where he is also head of the Department of Basic and Clinical Neuroscience and Director of the King's Motor Neuron Disease Research Centre. In 2020, he received the Forbes Norris Award from the International Alliance Of Als/Mnd Associations and was a co-winner of the Healey Center International Prize for Innovation in ALS. His other awards include the Sheila Essey Award from the American Academy of Neurology and the Charcot Young Investigator Award from the Motor Neurone Disease Association. In 2021 he was appointed Senior Investigator at the National Institute for Health Research (NIHR).

He was elected a Fellow of the Academy of Medical Sciences in 2024.

== Biography ==
Al-Chalabi is married with two sons and is a drummer in a band in his spare time.

As a child, Al-Chalabi hoped to join the Australian Flying Ambulance. His father worked for BP and the family moved often. He was initially rejected from 14 different medical schools, going on to become a leader in his field. After completing neurology training, he worked as a consultant at King's College London in 2000, a research exchange scholar at Massachusetts General Hospital and Harvard University in 2001.

According to his Lancet profile;

"Chalabi’s collaboration with Robert H Brown Jr, Chair and Professor of Neurology at MGH resulted in the discovery of a chromosome 9p linkage in ALS and frontotemporal dementia. [...] A second related study, with researcher Chris Shaw, now head of the Department of Basic and Clinical Neuroscience at King’s College London, further paved the way for the detection of the most common cause of ALS, the C9orf72 mutation. In 2016, Al-Chalabi and colleagues identified new risk variants and found evidence of ALS being a complex genetic trait with a polygenetic architecture, describing four new ALS genes. [...] [Al-Chalabi] also leads the European JPND STRENGTH consortium, looking at the development of personalised treatments by interaction analysis of various risk factors, and co-leads a UK national ALS register, that aims to record all cases of the disease (of which there are an estimated 5000 at any one time)."
