= Gene expansion =

Gene expansion may refer to:

- Insertion (genetics)
- Trinucleotide repeat, sometimes classified as a subgroup of insertions.
