= Spinocerebellar ataxia =

Progressive neurological disease

- Other names: Spinocerebellar atrophy or Spinocerebellar degeneration
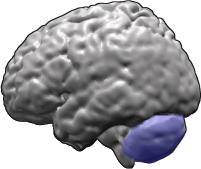
- Cerebellum (in blue) of the human brain
- Specialty: Neurology
- Frequency: 0.005%

Spinocerebellar ataxia (SCA) is a progressive, degenerative, genetic disease with multiple types, each of which could be considered a neurological condition in its own right. An estimated 150,000 people in the United States have a diagnosis of spinocerebellar ataxia at any given time. SCA is hereditary, progressive, and degenerative. There is no known effective treatment or cure. SCA can affect anyone of any age. The disease is caused by either a recessive or dominant gene. In many cases people are not aware that they carry a relevant gene until they have children who begin to show signs of having the disorder. Currently, research is being conducted at universities, such as the University of Minnesota, to elucidate many of the unknown characteristics of the disease.

== Signs and symptoms ==
Spinocerebellar ataxia (SCA) is one of a group of genetic disorders characterized by slowly progressive incoordination of gait and is often associated with poor coordination of hands, speech, and eye movements. A review of different clinical features among SCA subtypes was recently published describing the frequency of non-cerebellar features, like parkinsonism, chorea, pyramidalism, cognitive impairment, peripheral neuropathy, seizures, among others. As with other forms of ataxia, SCA frequently results in atrophy of the cerebellum, loss of fine coordination of muscle movements leading to unsteady and clumsy motion, and other symptoms. Ocular deficits can be quantified using the SODA scale.

The symptoms of an ataxia vary with the specific type and with the individual patient. Many subtypes of spinocerebellar ataxia result in cases where an individual retains full mental capacity but progressively loses physical control, but nearly half of the identified subtypes result in cognitive dysfunction, dementia, and intellectual disability.

== Cause ==
The hereditary ataxias are categorized by mode of inheritance and causative gene or chromosomal locus. The hereditary ataxias can be inherited in an autosomal dominant, autosomal recessive, or X-linked manner.

- Many types of autosomal dominant cerebellar ataxias for which specific genetic information is available are now known. Synonyms for autosomal-dominant cerebellar ataxias (ADCA) used prior to the current understanding of the molecular genetics were Marie's ataxia, inherited olivopontocerebellar atrophy, cerebello-olivary atrophy, or the more generic term "spinocerebellar degeneration". (Spinocerebellar degeneration is a rare inherited neurological disorder of the central nervous system characterized by the slow degeneration of certain areas of the brain. There are three forms of spinocerebellar degeneration: Types 1, 2, 3. Symptoms begin during adulthood.)
- There are five typical autosomal-recessive disorders in which ataxia is a prominent feature: Friedreich ataxia, ataxia-telangiectasia, ataxia with vitamin E deficiency, ataxia with oculomotor apraxia (AOA), spastic ataxia. Disorder subdivisions: Friedreich's ataxia, spinocerebellar ataxia, ataxia telangiectasia, vasomotor ataxia, vestibulocerebellar, ataxiadynamia, ataxiophemia, and olivopontocerebellar atrophy.
- There have been reported cases where a polyglutamine expansion may lengthen when passed down, which often can result in an earlier age-of-onset and a more severe disease phenotype for individuals who inherit the disease allele. This falls under the category of genetic anticipation. Several types of SCA are characterized by repeat expansion of the trinucleotide sequence CAG in DNA that encodes a polyglutamine repeat tract in protein. The expansion of CAG repeats over successive generations appears to be due to slipped strand mispairing during DNA replication or DNA repair.
There are numerous types of autosomal-dominant cerebellar ataxias.

There are five typical autosomal recessive disorders in which ataxia is a prominent feature.

== Diagnosis and classification ==
=== Classification ===
A few SCAs remain unspecified and can not be precisely diagnosed, but in the last decade genetic testing has allowed precise identification of dozens of different SCAs and more tests are being added each year. In 2008, a genetic ataxia blood test developed to test for 12 types of SCA, Friedreich's ataxia, and several others. However, since not every SCA has been genetically identified some SCAs are still diagnosed by neurological examination, which may include a physical exam, family history, MRI scanning of the brain and spine, and spinal tap.

Many SCAs below fall under the category of polyglutamine diseases, which are caused when a disease-associated protein (i.e., ataxin-1, ataxin-3, etc.) contains a large number of repeats of glutamine residues, termed a polyQ sequence or a "CAG trinucleotide repeat" disease for either the one-letter designation or codon for glutamine respectively. The threshold for symptoms in most forms of SCA is around 35, though for SCA3 it extends beyond 50. Most polyglutamine diseases are dominant due to the interactions of resulting polyQ tail.

The first ataxia gene was identified in 1993 and called "Spinocerebellar ataxia type 1" (SCA1); later genes were called SCA2, SCA3, etc. Usually, the "type" number of "SCA" refers to the order in which the gene was found. At this time, there are at least 49 different gene mutations that have been found.

The following is a list of some of the many types of Spinocerebellar ataxia.

SCA Type	Average Onset Age (Range in Years)	Average Duration (Range in Years)	Clinical signs and symptoms	Common origin	Problems with DNA
SCA1 (ATXN1)	4th decade (<10 to >60)	15 years (10–35)	Hypermetric saccades, slow saccades, upper motor neuron (note: saccades relates to eye movement)		CAG repeat, 6p (Ataxin 1)
SCA2 (ATXN2)	3rd–4th decade (<10 to >60)	10 years (1–30)	Diminished velocity saccades areflexia (absence of neurologic reflexes)	Cuba	CAG repeat, 12q
SCA3 (MJD) (ATXN3)	4th decade (10–70)	10 years (1–20)	Also called Machado-Joseph disease (MJD); Gaze-evoked nystagmus (a rapid, involuntary, oscillatory motion of the eyeball) upper motor neuron slow saccades	Azores (Portugal)	CAG repeat, 14q
SCA4 (ZFHX3)	4th–7th decade (19–72)	Decades	areflexia (absence of neurologic reflexes)		Chromosome 16q
SCA5 (SPTBN2)	3rd–4th decade (10–68)	>25 years	Pure cerebellar		Chromosome 11
SCA6 (CACNA1A)	5th–6th decade (19–71)	>25 years	Downbeating nystagmus, positional vertigo Symptoms can appear for the first time as late as 65 years old.		CAG repeat, 19p Calcium channel gene
SCA7 (ATXN7)	3rd–4th decade (0.5–60)	20 years (1–45; early onset correlates with shorter duration)	Macular degeneration, upper motor neuron, slow saccades		CAG repeat, 3p (Ataxin 7)
SCA8 (IOSCA)	39 yrs (18–65)	Normal lifespan	Gait ataxia, dysarthria, Horizontal nystagmus (a rapid, involuntary, oscillatory motion of the eyeball), dysphagia, lack of coordination/clumsiness		CTG repeat, 13q
SCA10 (ATXN10)	36 years	9 years	ataxia, seizures	Mexico	Chromosome 22q linked pentanucleotide repeat
SCA11 (TTBK2)	30 yrs (15–70)	Normal lifespan	Mild, remain ambulatory (able to walk about on one's own)		15q
SCA12 (PPP2R2B)	33 yrs (8–55)		Head and hand tremor, akinesia (loss of normal motor function, resulting in impaired muscle movement)		CAG repeat, 5q
SCA13 (KCNC3)	Childhood or adulthood depending on mutation	Depending on KCNC3 (a kind of gene)	Intellectual disability		19q
SCA14 (PRKCG)	28 yrs (12–42)	Decades (1–30)	Myoclonus (a sudden twitching of muscles or parts of muscles, without any rhythm or pattern, occurring in various brain disorders)		19q
SCA16 (ITPR1)	39 yrs (20–66)	1–40 years	Head and hand tremor		8q
SCA17 (TBP)					CAG repeat, 6q (TATA-binding protein)
SCA19, SCA22 (KCND3)			Mild cerebellar syndrome, dysarthria		
SCA25	1.5–39 yrs	Unknown	ataxia with sensory neuropathy, vomiting and gastrointestinal pain.		2p
SCA27 (FGF14)	15–20 yrs	Unknown	ataxia with poor cognition, dyskinesias and tremor.		FGF14 13q34
SCA35	40–48 years	Unknown	gait and limb ataxia, dysarthria, ocular dysmetria, intention tremor, pseudobulbar palsy, spasmodic torticollis, extensor plantar responses, reduced proprioception and hyperreflexia	China	transglutaminase 6 (TGM6) located at chromosome 20p13
SCA36	5th and 6th decade (adulthood)	Decades	ataxia, hyperrheflexia, dysarthria, fasciculations of the tongue with subsequent wasting of the tongue	Galicia (Spain)	NOP56
SCA37	Adulthood	Decades	dysarthria, slowly progressive gait and limb ataxia with severe dysmetria in the lower extremities, mild dysmetria in the upper extremities, dysphagia, and abnormal ocular movements	Province of Huelva (Spain)	DAB1

Others include SCA18, SCA20, SCA21, SCA23, SCA26, SCA28, and SCA29.

Four X-linked types have been described ( 302500, 302600, 301790, 301840), but only the first of these has so far been tied to a gene (SCAX1).

Name	OMIM	RareDiseases	Other
Anemia, sideroblastic spinocerebellar ataxia; Pagon Bird Detter syndrome	301310	Disease ID 668 at NIH's Office of Rare Diseases	
Friedreich's ataxia; Spinocerebellar ataxia, Friedreich	229300	Disease ID 6468 at NIH's Office of Rare Diseases	
Infantile onset Spinocerebellar ataxia	605361	Disease ID 4062 at NIH's Office of Rare Diseases	
Spinocerebellar ataxia 1	164400	Disease ID 4071 at NIH's Office of Rare Diseases	
Spinocerebellar ataxia 2	183090	Disease ID 4072 at NIH's Office of Rare Diseases	
Spinocerebellar ataxia 3; Machado Joseph disease	109150	Disease ID 6801 at NIH's Office of Rare Diseases	
Spinocerebellar ataxia 4	600223	Disease ID 9970 at NIH's Office of Rare Diseases	
Spinocerebellar ataxia 5	600224	Disease ID 4953 at NIH's Office of Rare Diseases	
Spinocerebellar ataxia 7	164500	Disease ID 4955 at NIH's Office of Rare Diseases	
Spinocerebellar ataxia 8	603680	Disease ID 4956 at NIH's Office of Rare Diseases	
Spinocerebellar ataxia 13	605259	Disease ID 9611 at NIH's Office of Rare Diseases	
Spinocerebellar ataxia 18	607458	Disease ID 9976 at NIH's Office of Rare Diseases	
Spinocerebellar ataxia 19	607346	Disease ID 9969 at NIH's Office of Rare Diseases	
Spinocerebellar ataxia 20	608687	Disease ID 9997 at NIH's Office of Rare Diseases	
Spinocerebellar ataxia 21	607454	Disease ID 9999 at NIH's Office of Rare Diseases	
Spinocerebellar ataxia 23	610245	Disease ID 9950 at NIH's Office of Rare Diseases	
Spinocerebellar ataxia 25	608703	Disease ID 9996 at NIH's Office of Rare Diseases	
Spinocerebellar ataxia 26	609306	Disease ID 9995 at NIH's Office of Rare Diseases	
Spinocerebellar ataxia 28	610246	Disease ID 9951 at NIH's Office of Rare Diseases	
Spinocerebellar ataxia 30	117360	Disease ID 9975 at NIH's Office of Rare Diseases	
Spinocerebellar ataxia 35	613908	Disease ID at NIH's Office of Rare Diseases	
Spinocerebellar ataxia amyotrophy deafness syndrome		Disease ID 2451 at NIH's Office of Rare Diseases	ORPHA:2074 at Orphanet
Spinocerebellar ataxia, autosomal recessive 1	606002	Disease ID 4949 at NIH's Office of Rare Diseases	
Spinocerebellar ataxia, autosomal recessive 3	271250	Disease ID 9971 at NIH's Office of Rare Diseases	
Spinocerebellar ataxia, autosomal recessive 4	607317	Disease ID 4952 at NIH's Office of Rare Diseases	
Spinocerebellar ataxia, autosomal recessive 5	606937	Disease ID 9977 at NIH's Office of Rare Diseases	
Spinocerebellar ataxia, autosomal recessive 6	608029	Disease ID 4954 at NIH's Office of Rare Diseases	
Spinocerebellar ataxia, autosomal recessive 21 - mutation in SCYL1	Online Mendelian Inheritance in Man (OMIM): 616719		ORPHA:466794
Spinocerebellar ataxia, autosomal recessive, with axonal neuropathy	607250	Disease ID 10000 at NIH's Office of Rare Diseases	
Spinocerebellar ataxia, X-linked, 2	302600	Disease ID 9978 at NIH's Office of Rare Diseases	
Spinocerebellar ataxia, X-linked, 3	301790	Disease ID 9981 at NIH's Office of Rare Diseases	
Spinocerebellar ataxia, X-linked, 4	301840	Disease ID 9980 at NIH's Office of Rare Diseases	

== Treatment ==
=== Medication ===
There is no cure for spinocerebellar ataxia, which is currently considered to be a progressive and irreversible disease, although not all types cause equally severe disability.

In general, treatments are directed towards alleviating symptoms, not the disease itself. Many patients with hereditary or idiopathic forms of ataxia have other symptoms in addition to ataxia. Medications or other therapies might be appropriate for some of these symptoms, which could include tremor, stiffness, depression, spasticity, and sleep disorders, among others. Both onset of initial symptoms and duration of disease are variable. If the disease is caused by a polyglutamine trinucleotide repeat CAG expansion, a longer expansion may lead to an earlier onset and a more radical progression of clinical symptoms. Typically, a person with this disease will eventually be unable to perform daily tasks (ADLs). However, rehabilitation therapists can help patients to maximize their ability of self-care and delay deterioration to certain extent. Researchers are exploring multiple avenues for a cure including RNA interference (RNAi) technology, the use of stem cells, and several other avenues.

On January 18, 2017, BioBlast Pharma announced completion of Phase 2a clinical trials of their medication, trehalose, in the treatment of SCA3. BioBlast has received FDA Fast Track status and orphan drug status for their treatment. The information provided by BioBlast in their research indicates that they hope this treatment may prove efficacious in other SCA treatments that have similar pathology related to PolyA and PolyQ diseases.

In addition, Dr. Beverly Davidson has been working on a methodology using RNAi technology to find a potential cure for over 2 decades. Her research began in the mid-1990s and progressed to work with mouse models about a decade later and most recently has moved to a study with non-human primates. The results from her most recent research "are supportive of clinical application of this gene therapy".

Finally, another gene transfer technology discovered in 2011 has also been shown by Boudreau et al. to hold great promise and offers yet another avenue to a potential future cure.

=== N-Acetyl-Leucine ===
N-Acetyl-Leucine is an orally administered, modified amino acid that is being developed as a novel treatment for multiple rare and common neurological disorders by IntraBio Inc (Oxford, United Kingdom).

N-Acetyl-Leucine has been granted multiple orphan drug designations from the U.S. Food & Drug Administration (FDA) and the European Medicines Agency (EMA) for the treatment of various genetic diseases, including spinocerebellar ataxias. N-Acetyl-Leucine has also been granted Orphan Drug Designations in the US and EU for the related inherited cerebellar ataxia ataxia-telangiectasia by the FDA and the EMA.

Published case series studies have demonstrated the effects of acute treatment with N-Acetyl-Leucine for the treatment of inherited cerebellar ataxias, including spinocerebellar ataxias. These studies further demonstrated that the treatment is well tolerated, with a good safety profile. A multinational clinical trial investigating N-Acetyl-L-Leucine for the treatment of a related inherited cerebellar ataxia, ataxia-telangiectasia, began in 2019.

IntraBio is also conducting parallel clinical trials with N-Acetyl-L-Leucine for the treatment of Niemann-Pick disease type C and GM2 gangliosidosis (Tay–Sachs and Sandhoff disease). Future opportunities to develop N-Acetyl-Leucine include Lewy body dementia, amyotrophic lateral sclerosis, restless leg syndrome, multiple sclerosis, and migraine.

=== Rehabilitation ===
Physical therapists can assist patients in maintaining their level of independence through therapeutic exercise programmes. One recent research report demonstrated a gain of two SARA points (Scale for the Assessment and Rating of Ataxia) from physical therapy. In general, physical therapy emphasises postural balance and gait training for ataxia patients. General conditioning such as range-of-motion exercises and muscle strengthening would also be included in therapeutic exercise programmes. Research showed that spinocerebellar ataxia 2 (SCA2) patients with a mild stage of the disease gained significant improvement in static balance and neurological indices after six months of a physical therapy exercise training program. Occupational therapists may assist patients with incoordination or ataxia issues through the use of adaptive devices. Such devices may include a cane, crutches, walker, or wheelchair for those with impaired gait. Other devices are available to assist with writing, feeding, and self care if hand and arm coordination are impaired. A randomised clinical trial revealed that an intensive rehabilitation program with physical and occupational therapies for patients with degenerative cerebellar diseases can significantly improve functional gains in ataxia, gait, and activities of daily living. Some level of improvement was shown to be maintained 24 weeks post-treatment. Speech language pathologists may use both behavioral intervention strategies as well as augmentative and alternative communication devices to help patients with impaired speech.
