= Bryan J. Traynor =

Neuroscientist and geneticist (born 1969)

- Born: 1969 (age 56–57); Dublin, Ireland
- Citizenship: Irish-American
- Education: University College Dublin (MB, BCh, BAO; MD; PhD); Harvard–MIT Program in Health Sciences and Technology (MMSc)
- Known for: Co-discovery of the C9orf72 hexanucleotide repeat expansion
- Awards: Breakthrough Prize; Potamkin Prize; Sheila Essey Award
- Scientific career
- Fields: Neurology; Neurogenetics; Amyotrophic lateral sclerosis Frontotemporal dementia
- Workplaces: National Institutes of Health (NIA); Johns Hopkins University

Bryan J. Traynor is an Irish-American neurologist and neurogeneticist whose work focuses on the genetics of amyotrophic lateral sclerosis (ALS) and frontotemporal dementia (FTD). He is known for his contributions to the identification of the C9orf72 hexanucleotide repeat expansion as a major genetic cause of ALS and FTD. Traynor has conducted much of his work at the U.S. National Institutes of Health (NIH), where his research has examined genetic mechanisms underlying neurodegenerative disease and their potential clinical implications.

Traynor has received multiple awards recognizing his contributions to ALS and related dementia research, including the 2026 Breakthrough Prize in Life Sciences, the Potamkin Prize for Dementia Research, and the Sheila Essey Award.

== Education ==
Traynor earned the degrees of MB, BCh, BAO (1993) and MD (2000) from University College Dublin, and later completed a PhD (2012) at the same institution. He also received a Master of Medical Science (MMSc) in drug development and clinical trial design through the Harvard–MIT Health Sciences and Technology (HST) program. He completed neurology residency training and fellowship training at Brigham and Women's Hospital and Massachusetts General Hospital.

== Research career ==
Traynor is a senior investigator at the NIH and an adjunct professor at Johns Hopkins University. His research addresses the genetic and molecular basis of ALS and related neurodegenerative disorders, with an emphasis on large-scale human genetics and genotype–phenotype relationships across ALS and FTD.

He has participated in and led collaborative genetic studies identifying and characterizing disease-associated variants, including studies identifying associations with genes such as C9orf72, VCP, MATR3, KIF5A, HTT, and SPTLC1 in ALS and dementia. This work has contributed to understanding the overlap between ALS and FTD and to describing the biological pathways involved in neurodegeneration.

At NIH, Traynor has led and collaborated on multidisciplinary efforts integrating human genetics, molecular biology, biomarker discovery, gene therapy development, and clinical neurology. His research has been published in peer-reviewed journals, including Nature Genetics, Neuron, and Nature Medicine.

== Awards, prizes, and honors ==
- 2012 - Derek Denny-Brown Award
- 2012 – Elected fellow of the American Neurological Association
- 2012 – National Institutes of Health Director's Award
- 2013 – Sheila Essey Award
- 2016 – Potamkin Prize
- 2020 – Elected fellow of the Royal College of Physicians of Ireland
- 2021 – Elected fellow of the Royal College of Physicians (London)
- 2022 – Elected member of the Association of American Physicians
- 2025 – F.E. Bennett Award of the American Neurological Association
- 2025 – Sean M. Healey International Prize in ALS
- 2026 – Breakthrough Prize in Life Sciences

== Notable professional service ==
Traynor has held leadership and service roles in research and scientific publishing, including Chief of the Neuromuscular Diseases Research Section, NIA, NIH. He has served as co-chair of the NIH Gene Therapy Task Force and led the RNA Therapeutics Laboratory, NCATS, NIH (2021–2025). He was a member of the NIH Health Genetics of Health and Disease study section (2015–2021) and chaired the Congressionally Mandated U.S. Department of Defense ALS Research Program (2015–2019).

In addition to academic appointments, he has served in editorial roles including associate editor of Brain and as a member of editorial boards for journals such as the Journal of Neurology, Neurosurgery & Psychiatry, Neurobiology of Aging (2015–2024), JAMA Neurology (2017–2021), and eClinicalMedicine.
