= SCYL1 =

Human gene

Identifiers
- Aliases: SCYL1, GKLP, NKTL, NTKL, P105, TAPK, TEIF, TRAP, HT019, SCAR21, SCY1 like pseudokinase 1
- External IDs: OMIM: 607982; MGI: 1931787; GeneCards: SCYL1

Gene location (Human)
Chr.	Chromosome 11 (human)
Band	11q13.1	Start	65,525,077 bp
Band	11q13.1	End	65,538,704 bp

Gene location (Mouse)
Chr.	Chromosome 19 (mouse)
Band	19 A|19 4.34 cM	Start	5,808,379 bp
Band	19 A|19 4.34 cM	End	5,821,447 bp
RNA expression pattern
Bgee	Human / Mouse (ortholog); Top expressed in: apex of heart; muscle of thigh; left adrenal cortex; right adrenal gland; gastrocnemius muscle; right lobe of liver; anterior pituitary; right lobe of thyroid gland; right adrenal cortex; right ovary / Top expressed in: ascending aorta; aortic valve; motor neuron; internal carotid artery; external carotid artery; fossa; condyle; muscle of thigh; tunica media of zone of aorta; substantia nigra; More reference expression data
BioGPS	n/a
Gene ontology
Molecular function	DNA binding; protein kinase activity; protein tyrosine kinase activity; ATP binding; cadherin binding
Cellular component	microtubule organizing center; cis-Golgi network; Golgi apparatus; COPI vesicle coat; cytoskeleton; membrane; nucleus; endoplasmic reticulum-Golgi intermediate compartment; cytoplasm; cytosol
Biological process	protein phosphorylation; regulation of transcription, DNA-templated; retrograde vesicle-mediated transport, Golgi to endoplasmic reticulum; vesicle-mediated transport; transcription, DNA-templated; peptidyl-tyrosine phosphorylation; transport
Sources:Amigo / QuickGO
Orthologs
Databases	NCBI: entry; OMA: entry
Species	Human	Mouse
Entrez	57410	78891
Ensembl	ENSG00000142186	ENSMUSG00000024941
UniProt	Q96KG9	Q9EQC5
RefSeq (mRNA)	NM_001048218; NM_020680	NM_023912; NM_001361921; NM_001361922
RefSeq (protein)	NP_001041683; NP_065731	NP_076401; NP_001348850; NP_001348851
Location (UCSC)	Chr 11: 65.53 – 65.54 Mb	Chr 19: 5.81 – 5.82 Mb
PubMed search
- Wikidata
View/Edit Human	View/Edit Mouse

SCY1-like 1 (S. cerevisiae), also known as SCYL1, is a human gene which is highly conserved throughout evolution.

== Function ==
This gene encodes a transcriptional regulator belonging to the SCY1-like family of kinase-like proteins. The protein has a divergent N-terminal kinase domain that is thought to be catalytically inactive, and can bind specific DNA sequences through its C-terminal domain. It activates transcription of the telomerase reverse transcriptase and DNA polymerase beta genes. The protein has been localized to the nucleus, and also to the cytoplasm and centrosomes during mitosis. Multiple transcript variants encoding different isoforms have been found for this gene. At least three of the transcripts code for a protein containing all exons, referred to as full-length (FL).

The mouse homolog of FL-Scyl1 is 90% identical and 93% similar in amino acid content to human FL-Scyl1. In Mus Musculus FL-Scyl1 encodes an 806-amino acid polypeptide. The FL protein contains HEAT repeats and a C-terminal coiled coil domain that also contains multiple dibasic motifs, and ends in the dibasic motif RKLD-COOH.

Scyl1 localizes to the cis-Golgi and ER-Golgi Intermediate Compartment (ERGIC). Scyl1 binds to Coatomer I (COPI) and colocalizes with beta-COPI and ERGIC53. siRNA mediated knockdown of the protein disrupted retrograde flow of the KDEL receptor from the Golgi to the ER. Furthermore, Scyl1 localization in rat hippocampal neurons also demonstrates a similar relationship to COPI.

== Clinical significance ==
Mutations in Scyl1 are the genetic defect resulting in the phenotype of muscle deficient mice (mdf mice) that suffer from a progressive neurodegeneration of the cerebellum and lower motor neurons. Mdf mice model human spinocerebellar ataxia type disorders.
