= TTBK2 =

Protein-coding gene in the species Homo sapiens

Identifiers
- Aliases: TTBK2, SCA11, TTBK, tau tubulin kinase 2
- External IDs: OMIM: 611695; MGI: 2155779; GeneCards: TTBK2
Enzyme activity
EC #	BRENDA	ExPASy	KEGG	MetaCyc
2.7.11.1	↗	↗	↗	↗

Gene location (Human)
Chr.	Chromosome 15 (human)
Band	15q15.2	Start	42,738,730 bp
Band	15q15.2	End	42,920,809 bp

Gene location (Mouse)
Chr.	Chromosome 2 (mouse)
Band	2|2 E5	Start	120,563,297 bp
Band	2|2 E5	End	120,681,085 bp
RNA expression pattern
Bgee	Human / Mouse (ortholog); Top expressed in: lateral nuclear group of thalamus; Brodmann area 23; pons; parietal lobe; postcentral gyrus; cerebellar vermis; pars compacta; sperm; superior vestibular nucleus; primary visual cortex / Top expressed in: spermatid; spermatocyte; facial motor nucleus; anterior horn of spinal cord; superior cervical ganglion; central gray substance of midbrain; supraoptic nucleus; deep cerebellar nuclei; trigeminal ganglion; medial vestibular nucleus; More reference expression data
BioGPS	n/a
Gene ontology
Molecular function	transferase activity; nucleotide binding; protein kinase activity; kinase activity; protein serine/threonine kinase activity; protein binding; ATP binding; kinesin binding; tau protein binding; tau-protein kinase activity; microtubule plus-end binding
Cellular component	cytoplasm; ciliary basal body; cytosol; cell projection; cilium; ciliary transition zone; centriole; cytoskeleton; nucleus; extracellular space
Biological process	phosphorylation; protein phosphorylation; cell projection organization; peptidyl-serine phosphorylation; smoothened signaling pathway; regulation of cell shape; cilium assembly; ciliary basal body-plasma membrane docking; microtubule cytoskeleton organization; negative regulation of microtubule depolymerization; peptidyl-threonine phosphorylation; cerebellum development; cerebellar granular layer development; cerebellar granule cell precursor tangential migration; regulation of cell migration; negative regulation of protein localization to microtubule; negative regulation of microtubule binding
Sources:Amigo / QuickGO
Orthologs
Databases	NCBI: entry; OMA: entry
Species	Human	Mouse
Entrez	146057	140810
Ensembl	ENSG00000128881	ENSMUSG00000090100
UniProt	Q6IQ55	Q3UVR3
RefSeq (mRNA)	NM_173500	NM_001024856; NM_001024857; NM_080788
RefSeq (protein)	NP_775771	NP_001020027; NP_001020028; NP_542966
Location (UCSC)	Chr 15: 42.74 – 42.92 Mb	Chr 2: 120.56 – 120.68 Mb
PubMed search
- Wikidata
View/Edit Human	View/Edit Mouse

Tau tubulin kinase 2 is a protein in humans that is encoded by the TTBK2 gene. This gene encodes a serine-threonine kinase that putatively phosphorylates tau and tubulin proteins. Mutations in this gene cause spinocerebellar ataxia type 11 (SCA11); a neurodegenerative disease characterized by progressive ataxia and atrophy of the cerebellum and brainstem.
