= FGF14 =

Protein-coding gene in the species Homo sapiens

Identifiers
- Aliases: FGF14, FGF-14, FHF-4, FHF4, SCA27, fibroblast growth factor 14
- External IDs: OMIM: 601515; MGI: 109189; GeneCards: FGF14

Gene location (Human)
Chr.	Chromosome 13 (human)
Band	13q33.1	Start	101,710,804 bp
Band	13q33.1	End	102,402,457 bp

Gene location (Mouse)
Chr.	Chromosome 14 (mouse)
Band	14 E5|14 66.18 cM	Start	124,215,319 bp
Band	14 E5|14 66.18 cM	End	124,914,539 bp
RNA expression pattern
Bgee	Human / Mouse (ortholog); Top expressed in: secondary oocyte; middle temporal gyrus; bronchial epithelial cell; Brodmann area 23; cerebellar vermis; endothelial cell; postcentral gyrus; superior frontal gyrus; entorhinal cortex; primary visual cortex / Top expressed in: lumbar subsegment of spinal cord; lobe of cerebellum; barrel cortex; cerebellar vermis; olfactory tubercle; mammillary body; superior frontal gyrus; dentate gyrus of hippocampal formation granule cell; suprachiasmatic nucleus; supraoptic nucleus; More reference expression data
BioGPS	n/a
Gene ontology
Molecular function	fibroblast growth factor receptor binding; growth factor activity; heparin binding; protein binding
Cellular component	extracellular region; nucleus; intracellular anatomical structure
Biological process	regulation of synaptic vesicle recycling; JNK cascade; cell-cell signaling; fibroblast growth factor receptor signaling pathway; regulation of postsynaptic membrane potential; signal transduction; nervous system development; regulation of synaptic plasticity; positive regulation of high voltage-gated calcium channel activity; regulation of signaling receptor activity
Sources:Amigo / QuickGO
Orthologs
Databases	NCBI: entry; OMA: entry
Species	Human	Mouse
Entrez	2259	14169
Ensembl	ENSG00000102466	ENSMUSG00000025551
UniProt	Q92915	P70379
RefSeq (mRNA)	NM_004115; NM_175929; NM_001321931; NM_001321932; NM_001321933 NM_001321934; NM_001321935; NM_001321936; NM_001321937; NM_001321938; NM_001321939; NM_001321940; NM_001321941; NM_001321942; NM_001321943; NM_001321944; NM_001321945; NM_001321946; NM_001321947; NM_001321948; NM_001321949; NM_001379342	NM_010201; NM_207667
RefSeq (protein)	NP_001308860; NP_001308861; NP_001308862; NP_001308863; NP_001308864 NP_001308865; NP_001308866; NP_001308867; NP_001308868; NP_001308869; NP_001308870; NP_001308871; NP_001308872; NP_001308873; NP_001308874; NP_001308875; NP_001308876; NP_001308877; NP_001308878; NP_004106; NP_787125; NP_001366271	NP_034331; NP_997550
Location (UCSC)	Chr 13: 101.71 – 102.4 Mb	Chr 14: 124.22 – 124.91 Mb
PubMed search
- Wikidata
View/Edit Human	View/Edit Mouse

Fibroblast growth factor 14 is a biologically active protein that in humans is encoded by the FGF14 gene.

The protein encoded by this gene is a member of the fibroblast growth factor (FGF) family. FGF family members possess broad mitogenic and cell survival activities and are involved in a variety of biological processes, including embryonic development, cell growth, morphogenesis, tissue repair, tumor growth, and invasion. A mutation in this gene is associated with autosomal dominant cerebellar ataxia. Alternatively spliced transcript variants have been found for this gene.

FGF14 is mainly expressed in the central nervous system and is associated with neurodegenerative diseases such as spinocerebellar ataxia (SCA27). FGF14 deficiency also impairs the maturation of cells in the hippocampus, which is possibly related to the development of schizophrenia.

== Relationship with Alzheimer's disease ==
FGF14 levels are elevated in patients with Alzheimer's disease. FGF14 messenger RNA was also found to be upregulated in Alzheimer's patients, which suggests that it is involved in the pathogenesis of the disease, although the underlying mechanism is still unknown. Research is ongoing as to whether or not FGF14 could be used as a therapy against Alzheimer's disease as well as other neurodegenerative diseases, by promote neural proliferation and regulating the plasticity of the synapses.
