= Sheila Essey Award =

Neurology award

The Sheila Essey Award for ALS Research was established in 1996 and is sponsored by the American Academy of Neurology. The prize is funded through the philanthropy of the Essey family and the ALS Association. The award recognizes an individual who has made seminal research contributions in the search for the cause, prevention of, and cure for amyotrophic lateral sclerosis.

The award includes a trophy, a $50,000 prize, and a 20-minute lecture at the American Academy of Neurology annual meeting. The prize is named after Sheila Essey (wife of Richard Essey) who was diagnosed with amyotrophic lateral sclerosis in 1994.

== Awardees ==
Source: American Academy of Neurology

- 1996 Robert H. Brown Jr.
- 1996 Teepue Siddique
- 1997 Jeffrey Rothstein
- 1998 Theodore Munsat
- 1998 Lewis P. Rowland
- 1999 Don Cleveland
- 2000 Jean Pierre Julien
- 2001 Pamela Shaw
- 2002 Serge Przedborski
- 2003 Stanley Appel
- 2004 Peter Nigel Leigh
- 2005 Michael Strong
- 2006 Peter Carmeliet
- 2007 Christopher Henderson
- 2008 Wim Robberecht
- 2009 Merit Cudkowicz
- 2009 Orla Hardiman
- 2010 Clive Svendsen, PhD
- 2011 Leonard van den Berg
- 2012 Christopher Shaw, MD, FRACP
- 2013 Rosa Rademakers
- 2013 Bryan J. Traynor
- 2014 Jeremy Shefner
- 2015 Robert Bowser, PhD
- 2015 Adriano Chiò
- 2016 Ammar Al-Chalabi
- 2017 John M. Ravits
- 2018 Timothy Miller
- 2019 Aaron Gitler

== See also ==
- List of medicine awards
