= ATXN8OS =

Non-coding RNA in the species Homo sapiens

Identifiers
- Aliases: ATXN8OS, KLHL1AS, NCRNA00003, SCA8, ATXN8 opposite strand (non-protein coding), ATXN8 opposite strand lncRNA
- External IDs: OMIM: 603680; GeneCards: ATXN8OS
Orthologs
Databases	NCBI: entry; OMA: entry
Species	Human	Mouse
Entrez	6315	n/a
Ensembl	ENSG00000230223	n/a
UniProt	n a	n/a
RefSeq (mRNA)	n/a	n/a
RefSeq (protein)	n/a	n/a
Location (UCSC)	n/a	n/a
PubMed search		n/a
- Wikidata
View/Edit Human

Ataxin 8 opposite strand, also known as ATXN8OS, is a human gene.

== Function ==
SCA8 is an antisense transcript to the KLHL1 gene (homolog to the Drosophila KELCH gene); it does not itself appear to be protein coding. A cytidine, thymidine, guanosine (CTG) trinucleotide repeat expansion that is incorporated into the SCA8 but not the KLHL1 transcript causes spinocerebellar ataxia type 8. When the CTG expansion is present, a polyglutamine mutant protein is produced. Presumably the expansion interferes with normal antisense function of this transcript.

== See also ==
- RAN translation
- Trinucleotide repeat disorder
