= Machado–Joseph disease =

Genetic neurodegenerative disease

Machado-Joseph disease
- Other names: Autosomal dominant striatonigral degeneration, Nigro-spino-dentatal degeneration with nuclear ophthalmoplegia
- Machado–Joseph disease is inherited via an autosomal dominant manner
- Specialty: Neurology
- Frequency: 0.005%

Machado–Joseph disease (MJD), also known as Machado–Joseph Azorean disease, Machado's disease, Joseph's disease or spinocerebellar ataxia type 3 (SCA3), is a rare autosomal dominantly inherited neurodegenerative disease that causes progressive cerebellar ataxia, which results in a lack of muscle control and coordination of the upper and lower extremities. The symptoms are caused by a genetic mutation that results in an expansion of abnormal "CAG" trinucleotide repeats in the ATXN3 gene that results in an abnormal form of the protein ataxin which causes degeneration of cells in the hindbrain. Some symptoms, such as clumsiness and rigidity, make MJD commonly mistaken for drunkenness or Parkinson's disease.

Machado–Joseph disease is a type of spinocerebellar ataxia and is the most common cause of autosomal-dominant ataxia. MJD causes ophthalmoplegia and mixed sensory and cerebellar ataxia.

== Symptoms and signs ==
Symptoms of MJD are memory deficits, spasticity, difficulty with speech and swallowing, weakness in arms and legs, clumsiness, frequent urination and involuntary eye movements. Symptoms can begin in early adolescence and they get worse over time. Eventually, MJD leads to paralysis; however, intellectual functions usually remain the same.

== Genetics ==
Flores and São Miguel are centers of the Machado–Joseph disease in the Azores.

Machado Joseph's disease has multiple origins as SCA3 comes from haplotype of four different origins and was not from one origin in the Azores. Japan, Brazil and France all have been founder effects in areas with SCA3.

Spinocerebellar ataxia type 3 (SCA3) on the Azores are believed to have come from Portugal's northeast where Sephardic Jews lived. Belgium, French-Guiana and Algeria have their own MJD mutation origins. Portuguese have two mutations, while Brazil and France have one mutation, and Germans make up the majority of MJD patients in the United States. Individuals with Azorean MJD have their locus on the 14q24.3–32 chromosome, the same as some Japanese with MJD. It was an Azorean, William Machado, whose offspring in New England were the first to be diagnosed with MJD. The Azorean Joseph family, living in California, were also diagnosed with MJD. The same origin for MJD is found in the Azores and in America's north-west coast. Not only Portuguese have it since African Americans, Indians, Italians and Japanese also developed MJD.

In China, the mutation causing SCA type 3 has been estimated to have occurred 8,000 to 17,000 years ago.

In Japan, the oldest causative mutation appears to have occurred about 5774 +/- 1116 years ago.

Among aboriginal Australians, the founder mutation appears to have occurred about 7000 years ago. As this mutation is shared with other families based in Asia it seems likely that it was imported into Australia.

MJD affected Azoreans and Japanese had haplotypes in common while Azoreans also had haplotypes of two different origins.

== Pathophysiology ==
The disease is caused by a mutation in the ATXN3 gene, which is located on chromosome 14 (14q32.1). In exon 10 the gene contains lengthy irregular CAG repeats, producing a mutated protein called ataxin-3. (Normally, the number of copies is between 13 and 41.) MJD is an autosomal dominant disease, meaning that if either parent gives the defective gene to a child, the child will show symptoms of the disease. Therefore, if one parent has this condition and the other parent does not, there will be a 50% chance of their child inheriting the condition.

The pons in the brainstem is one of the areas affected by MJD. The striatum (a brain area connected to balance and movement) is also affected by this disease, which could explain both of the main motor problems cause by MJD: the tightening and twisting of the limb and the abrupt, irregular movements.

In affected cells, this protein builds up and assembles intranuclear inclusion bodies. These insoluble aggregates are hypothesized to interfere with the normal activity of the nucleus and induce the cell to degenerate and die.

== Diagnosis ==
MJD can be diagnosed by recognizing the symptoms of the disease and by taking a family history. Physicians ask patients questions about the kind of symptoms relatives with the disease had, the progression and harshness of symptoms, and the ages of onset in family members.

Presymptomatic diagnosis of MJD can be made with a genetic test. The direct detection of the genetic mutation responsible for MJD has been available since 1995. Genetic testing looks at the number of CAG repeats within the coding region of the MJD/ATXN3 gene on chromosome 14. The test will show positive for MJD if this region contains 61–87 repeats, as opposed to the 12–44 repeats found in healthy individuals. A limitation to this test is that if the number of CAG repeats in an individual being tested falls between the healthy and pathogenic ranges (45–60 repeats), then the test cannot predict whether an individual will have MJD symptoms.

=== Classification ===
There are five sub-types of MJD that are characterized by the age of onset and range of symptoms. The sub-types illustrate a wide variety of symptoms that patients can experience. However, assigning individuals to a specific sub-type of the disease is of limited clinical significance.

- Type I affects approximately 13% of individuals with MJD and has onset of symptoms between the ages of 10 and 30 years old. It usually progresses quickly, with patients experiencing severe rigidity and dystonia.
- Type II is the most common sub-type, affecting approximately 57% of individuals with MJD and symptoms typically begin between 20 and 50 years of age. It has an intermediate rate of progression and causes symptoms that include ataxia and spasticity, along with other upper motor neuron signs such as exaggerated deep tendon reflexes (DTRs).
- Type III occurs in approximately 30% of MJD patients and has a relatively slow progression, with symptoms typically arising between the ages of 40 and 70. Symptoms include muscle twitching and cramps, unpleasant sensations such as numbness, tingling, and pain in the feet and hands, and limb muscle atrophy. Nearly all patients experience a decline in their vision experienced as blurred vision, double vision, inability to control eye movements, and/or loss of capability to distinguish color. Some patients also experience Parkinsonian symptoms.
- Type IV is distinguished by Parkinsonian symptoms that respond particularly well to levodopa treatment.
- Type V appears to resemble Hereditary Spastic Paraplegia; however, more research is needed to conclude the relationship between Type V MJD and hereditary spastic paraplegia.

== Treatment ==
There is no cure for Machado-Joseph Disease. However, treatments are available for some symptoms. For example, spasticity can be reduced with antispasmodic drugs, such as baclofen. The Parkinsonian symptoms can be treated with levodopa therapy. Prism glasses can reduce diplopic symptoms. Physiotherapy/Physical Therapy and/or occupational therapy can help patients by prescribing mobility aids to increase the patients' independence, providing gait training, and prescribing exercises to maintain the mobility of various joints and general health to decrease the likelihood of falls or injuries as a result of falls. Walkers and wheelchairs can greatly help the patient with everyday tasks. Some patients will experience difficulties with speech and swallowing, therefore a Speech-Language Pathologist can assist the patients to improve their communicating abilities and their issues with swallowing.

Some experimental treatments using trehalose have been suggested. In 2021, the FDA accepted an Investigational New Drug (IND) application and granted fast track status for an injectable form of trehalose (SLS-005) as a potential treatment for spinocerebellar ataxia type 3 (SCA3).

== Prognosis ==
Patients with severe forms of MJD have a life expectancy of approximately 35 years. Those with mild forms have a normal life expectancy. The cause of death of those who die early is often aspiration pneumonia.

Unlike many other medical conditions, Machado–Joseph disease is not named after researchers. It is named after two men ("William Machado" and "Antone Joseph") who were the patriarchs of the families in which the condition was initially described. The highest prevalence of the condition is on Australia's Groote Eylandt where 5% of the population are currently symptomatic or at risk, followed by the Azorean island of Flores where around 1 in 140 individuals in the population are diagnosed with MJD.

== Culture and society ==
Brazilian comedian, actor and TV personality Guilherme Karam was diagnosed with Machado–Joseph disease, having inherited it from his mother, like his brother and sister. He died on 7 July 2016. In a video on Facebook just days after Karam's death, Brazilian personality, journalist and television presenter, Arnaldo Duran publicly acknowledged his condition with Machado-Joseph. Brazilian press gave huge attention to both cases.

== Ethical consideration ==
Ethicists have used Machado–Joseph disease as a paradigmatic illness to discuss the rights of a community of patients to control "ownership" of their disease, particularly when it comes to research on genetic testing. Also, as there currently is no clinical intervention to prevent the onset of the disease symptoms, there is discourse over whether individuals should get tested or not. The benefits of having MJD testing include a reduction in anxiety and uncertainty, and the ability to plan for the future. Some disadvantages include the anticipation of negative results and the individual's difficulties in adapting to this outcome.

== See also ==
- Trehalose
