= RAN translation =

Irregular mRNA translation

Repeat Associated Non-AUG translation, or RAN translation, is an irregular mode of mRNA translation that can occur in eukaryotic cells.

== Mechanism ==
For the majority of eukaryotic messenger RNAs (mRNAs), translation initiates from a methionine-encoding AUG start codon following the molecular processes of 'cap-binding' and 'scanning' by ribosomal pre-initiation complexes (PICs). In rare exceptions, such as translation by viral IRES-containing mRNAs, 'cap-binding' and/or 'scanning' are not required for initiation, although AUG is still typically used as the first codon. RAN translation is an exception to the canonical rules as it uses variable start site selection and initiates from a non-AUG codon, but may still depend on 'cap-binding' and 'scanning'.

== Disease ==
RAN translation produces a variety of dipeptide repeat proteins by translation of expanded hexanucleotide repeats present in an intron of the C9orf72 gene. The expansion of the hexanucleotide repeats and thus accumulation of dipeptide repeat proteins are thought to cause cellular toxicity that leads to neurodegeneration in ALS disease.

== See also ==
- Trinucleotide repeat disorder
- Eukaryotic translation
- C9orf72
