= Ataxin 7 =

Mammalian protein found in Homo sapiens

ATXN7

Identifiers
- Aliases: ATXN7, ADCAII, OPCA3, SCA7, ataxin 7, SGF73
- External IDs: OMIM: 607640; MGI: 2179277; GeneCards: ATXN7
Available structures
PDB	Ortholog search: PDBe RCSB
PDB	List of PDB id codes 2KKR

Gene location (Mouse)
Chr.	Chromosome 14 (mouse)
Band	14|14 A1	Start	8,362,461 bp
Band	14|14 A1	End	8,508,323 bp
Gene ontology
Molecular function	protein binding; thiol-dependent deubiquitinase
Cellular component	microtubule cytoskeleton; nuclear matrix; nucleolus; cytoskeleton; nucleus; nucleoplasm; cytoplasm; cytosol
Biological process	histone deubiquitination; regulation of transcription, DNA-templated; transcription, DNA-templated; nucleus organization; visual perception; microtubule cytoskeleton organization; protein deubiquitination
Sources:Amigo / QuickGO
Orthologs
Databases	NCBI: entry; OMA: entry
Species	Human	Mouse
Entrez	6314	246103
Ensembl	ENSG00000163635	ENSMUSG00000021738
UniProt	O15265	Q8R4I1
RefSeq (mRNA)	NM_001177387; NM_000333; NM_001128149	NM_139227
RefSeq (protein)	NP_000324; NP_001121621; NP_001170858; NP_001364334; NP_001364335	NP_631973
Location (UCSC)	n/a	Chr 14: 8.36 – 8.51 Mb
PubMed search
- Wikidata
View/Edit Human	View/Edit Mouse

SUPT20H
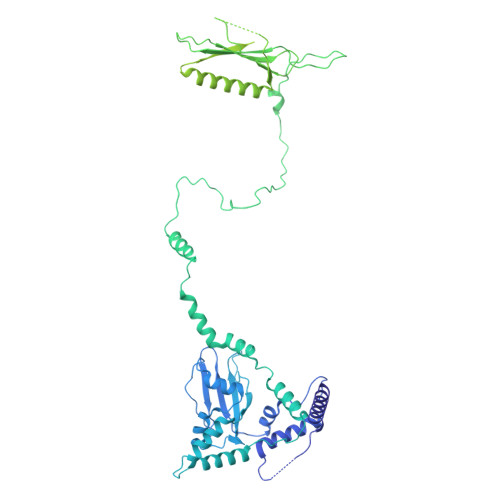
- SUPT20H is a subunit of the SAGA coactivator complex that regulates gene expression. SPT20H holds ATXN7 down to the core of the complex.

Identifiers
- Symbol: SUPT20H
- Alt. symbols: SPT20H; bA421P11.4; P38IP
- NCBI gene: 110679609
- HGNC: 20596
- PDB: 7KTR
- RefSeq: KAI4063086.1
- UniProt: Q8NEM7-3

Other data
- Locus: Chr. 3 q13.3
Search for
- Structures: Swiss-model
- Domains: InterPro

SAGA Coactivator Complex
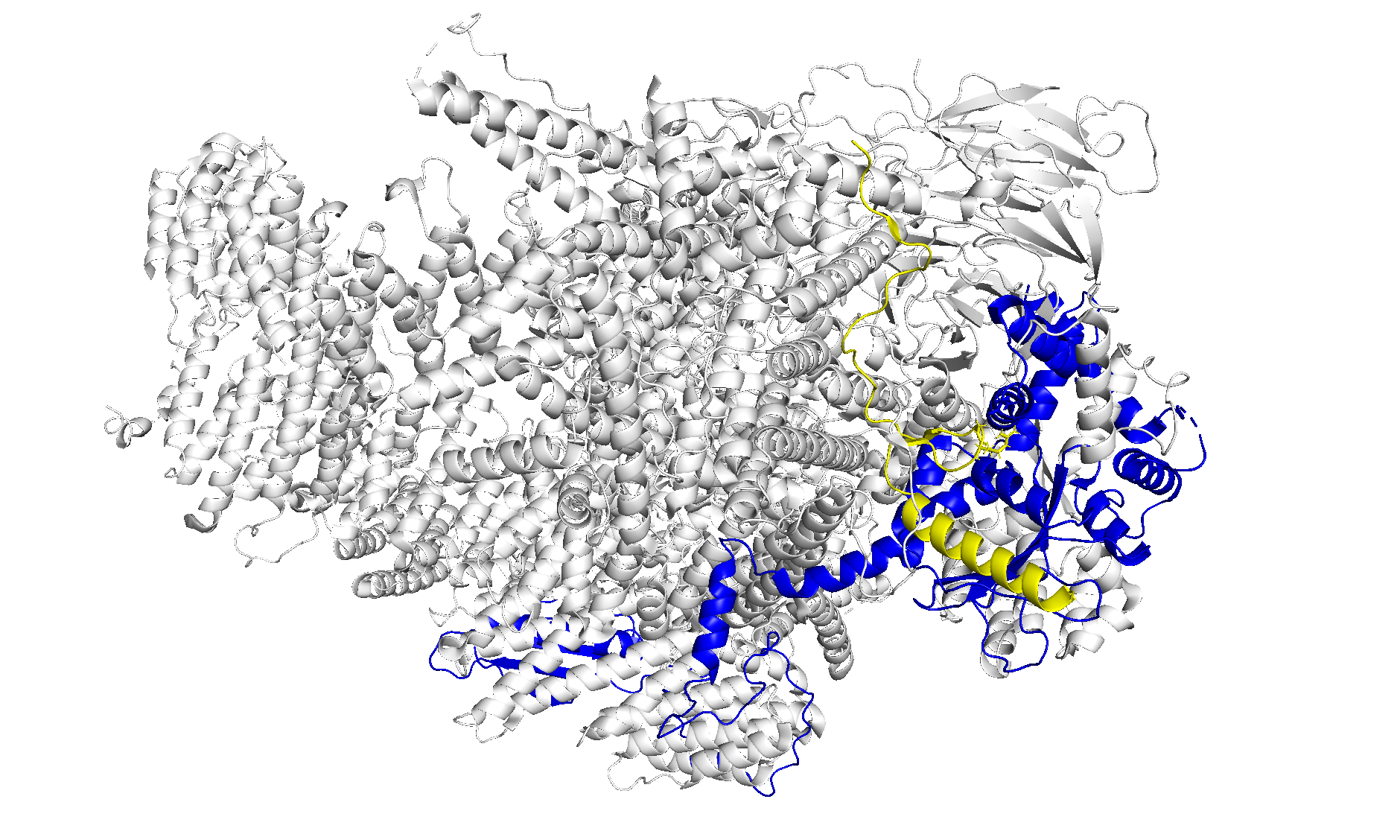
- ATXN7 (yellow) and SPT20H (blue) in the large SAGA coactivator complex. SAGA has a size of 1.4-MDa and is a regulatory hub for gene expression, chromatin modification, and DNA damage repair and signaling.

Identifiers
- Symbol: SAGA or STAGA
- Alt. symbols: Spt-Ada-Gcn5 acetyltransferase
- PDB: 7KTR

Ataxin-7 (ATXN7) is a protein of the SCA7 gene, located on chromosome 3. It is a subunit of the SAGA chromatin remodeling complex, which regulates gene expression; it contains 892 amino acids with an expandable poly(Q) region close to the N-terminus. The expandable poly(Q) motif region in the protein contributes crucially to spinocerebellar ataxia (SCA) pathogenesis by the induction of intranuclear inclusion bodies. ATXN7 is associated with both olivopontocerebellar atrophy type 3 (OPCA3) and spinocerebellar ataxia type 7 (SCA7).

Several CAG repeats within the coding region of the SCA genes will lead to pathological protein misfolding. The allele linked to SCA7 carries 37—306 CAG repeats near the N-terminus, whereas the normal allele has only 4—35 repeats. The CAG repeats in the ATXN7 gene have been linked to cerebellar and brainstem degeneration as well as retinal conerod dystrophy. The polyglutamine (polyQ) expansion at the N-terminus causes protein aggregation, impairing the gene expression of photoreceptor cell survival, leading to the symptoms of ataxia and vision loss. Research suggest that silencing of ATXN7 in the retina by RNAi can be a possible therapeutic strategy for patients with SCA7 retinal degeneration.

The N-terminus of ATXN7 is attached to a structural scaffold protein in the SAGA complex, SUPT20H. This interaction positions ATXN7 so that it can connect the deubiquitination (DUB) module to the complex, which is needed to remove ubiquitin modifications from histones, an essential step in transcription. Without the interaction between an arginine (Arg531) on ATXN7's N-terminus and a serine (Ser182) on the SUPT20H protein, the DUB module would not be anchored to the SAGA complex correctly, leading to defects in histone deubiquitination and gene regulation. Because of the length of the interaction being 3.3Å, it is characterized as a hydrogen bond keeping the two proteins attached.

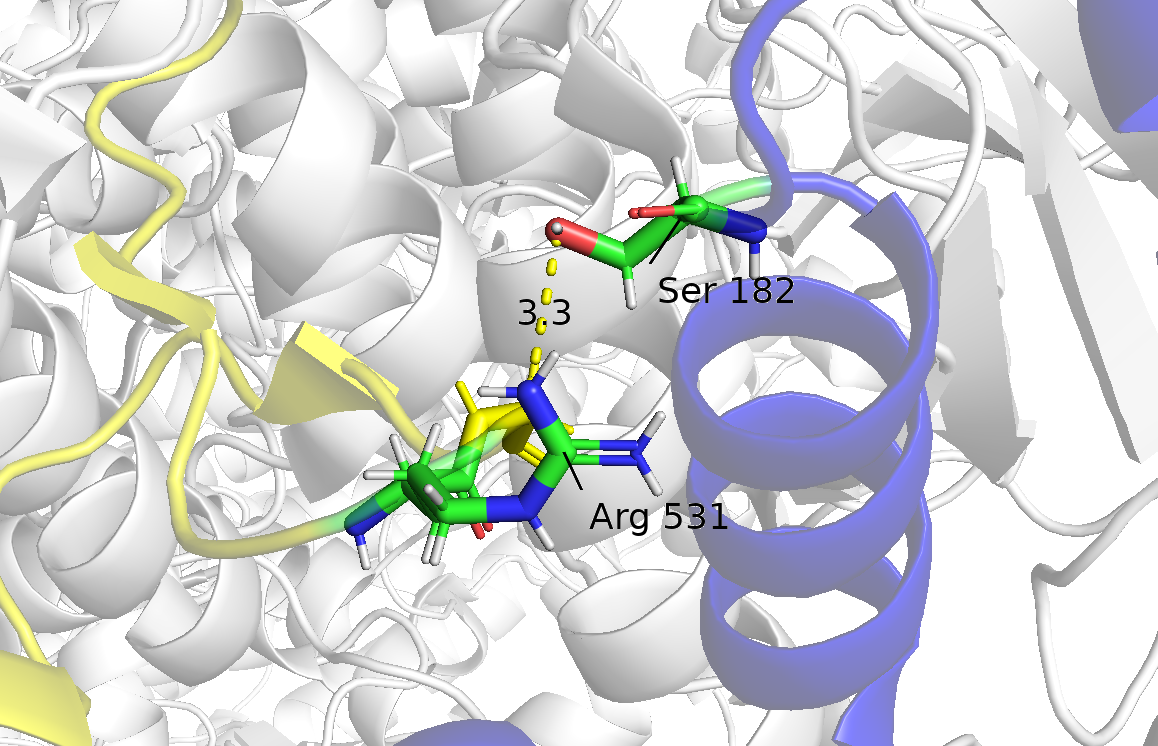
SPT20H is able to keep ATXN7 attached to the core of the SAGA coactivator complex through this interaction between the Ser182 on SPT20H (blue) and the Arg531 on ATXN7 (yellow). This interaction can be characterized as a hydrogen bond.
