= KCNC3 =

Protein-coding gene in the species Homo sapiens

Identifiers
- Aliases: KCNC3, KSHIIID, KV3.3, SCA13, potassium voltage-gated channel subfamily C member 3
- External IDs: OMIM: 176264; MGI: 96669; GeneCards: KCNC3

Gene location (Human)
Chr.	Chromosome 19 (human)
Band	19q13.33	Start	50,311,937 bp
Band	19q13.33	End	50,333,515 bp

Gene location (Mouse)
Chr.	Chromosome 7 (mouse)
Band	7 B3|7 28.85 cM	Start	44,590,664 bp
Band	7 B3|7 28.85 cM	End	44,604,754 bp
RNA expression pattern
Bgee	Human / Mouse (ortholog); Top expressed in: right uterine tube; cerebellar vermis; right hemisphere of cerebellum; left lobe of thyroid gland; right lobe of thyroid gland; vena cava; lateral nuclear group of thalamus; pons; inferior ganglion of vagus nerve; external globus pallidus / Top expressed in: cerebellar cortex; dentate gyrus of hippocampal formation granule cell; superior frontal gyrus; aortic arch; pontine nuclei; cerebellar vermis; primary visual cortex; lobe of cerebellum; deep cerebellar nuclei; lumbar subsegment of spinal cord; More reference expression data
BioGPS	n/a
Gene ontology
Molecular function	voltage-gated potassium channel activity; ion channel activity; potassium channel activity; voltage-gated ion channel activity; delayed rectifier potassium channel activity
Cellular component	integral component of membrane; voltage-gated potassium channel complex; plasma membrane; membrane; cytoplasm; cytoskeleton; cell cortex; cell junction; axon; dendrite; dendritic spine membrane; presynaptic membrane; cell projection; perikaryon; synapse; dendrite membrane; neuronal cell body membrane; soma
Biological process	potassium ion transport; regulation of ion transmembrane transport; protein homooligomerization; ion transport; protein tetramerization; transmembrane transport; potassium ion transmembrane transport
Sources:Amigo / QuickGO
Orthologs
Databases	NCBI: entry; OMA: entry
Species	Human	Mouse
Entrez	3748	16504
Ensembl	ENSG00000131398	ENSMUSG00000062785
UniProt	Q14003	Q63959
RefSeq (mRNA)	NM_004977; NM_001372305	NM_001290682; NM_008422
RefSeq (protein)	NP_004968; NP_001359234	NP_001277611; NP_001372554; NP_001372555; NP_001372556; NP_001372557 NP_001372558; NP_001372559; NP_001372560; NP_001372561; NP_001372562; NP_001372563; NP_001372564; NP_001372565; NP_001372566; NP_032448
Location (UCSC)	Chr 19: 50.31 – 50.33 Mb	Chr 7: 44.59 – 44.6 Mb
PubMed search
- Wikidata
View/Edit Human	View/Edit Mouse

Potassium voltage-gated channel, Shaw-related subfamily, member 3 also known as KCNC3 or K_{v}3.3 is a protein that in humans is encoded by the KCNC3.

== Function ==
The Shaker gene family of Drosophila encodes components of voltage-gated potassium channels and comprises four subfamilies. Based on sequence similarity, this gene is similar to one of these subfamilies, namely the Shaw subfamily. The protein encoded by this gene belongs to the delayed rectifier class of channel proteins and is an integral membrane protein that mediates the voltage-dependent potassium ion permeability of excitable membranes.

== Clinical significance ==
KCNC3 is associated with spinocerebellar ataxia type 13.

== See also ==
- Voltage-gated potassium channel
