= Polyglutamine tract =

Protein region with only glutamine units

A polyglutamine tract or polyQ tract is a portion of a protein consisting of a sequence of several glutamine units. A tract typically consists of about 10 to a few hundred such units.

A multitude of genes, in various eukaryotic species (including humans), contain a number of repetitions of the nucleotide triplet CAG or CAA. When the gene is translated into a protein, each of these triplets gives rise to a glutamine unit, resulting in a polyglutamine tract. Different alleles of such a gene often have different numbers of triplets since the highly repetitive sequence is prone to contraction and expansion.

Several inheritable neurodegenerative disorders, the polyglutamine diseases, occur if a mutation causes a polyglutamine tract in a specific gene to become too long. Important examples of polyglutamine diseases are spinocerebellar ataxia and Huntington's disease. Trinucleotide repeat expansion occurring in a parental germline cell can lead to children that are more affected or display an earlier onset and greater severity of the condition. Trinucleotide repeat expansion is considered to be a consequence of slipped strand mispairing either during DNA replication or DNA repair synthesis. It is believed that cells cannot properly dispose of proteins with overlong polyglutamine tracts, which over time leads to damage in nerve cells. The longer the polyglutamine tract, the earlier in life these diseases tend to appear. A characteristic feature of proteins with long polyglutamine tracts is that they become increasingly prone to forming clumps or aggregates, with the long polyglutamine segments driving this aggregation process. The end product of this aggregation process are protein inclusions that are thought to be fibrillar in their overall structure, sharing features common of amyloid aggregates.

== History ==
Nucleotide sequences encoding a lengthy polyQ tract were first noted in the gene encoding the Notch receptor. Variation of the length of this Notch polyQ tract, as caused by triplet repeat instability, was later found to cause developmental defects. The significance of similarly expanded tracts in humans became evident when polyQ tracts were found to underlie Huntington's disease and several spinocerebellar ataxias. In general, several neurodegenerative disorders were found to involve nucleotide repeat expansions in protein coding sequences.
