= C9orf72 =

Protein-coding gene in humans

Identifiers
- Aliases: C9orf72, chromosome 9 open reading frame 72, ALSFTD, FTDALS, FTDALS1, DENNL72, C9orf72-SMCR8 complex subunit, DENND9
- External IDs: OMIM: 614260; MGI: 1920455; GeneCards: C9orf72

Gene location (Human)
Chr.	Chromosome 9 (human)
Band	9p21.2	Start	27,535,640 bp
Band	9p21.2	End	27,573,866 bp

Gene location (Mouse)
Chr.	Chromosome 4 (mouse)
Band	4|4 A5	Start	35,191,285 bp
Band	4|4 A5	End	35,226,175 bp
RNA expression pattern
Bgee	Human / Mouse (ortholog); Top expressed in: monocyte; mucosa of paranasal sinus; bronchial epithelial cell; cerebellar vermis; right lung; right uterine tube; cerebellar hemisphere; Brodmann area 23; right hemisphere of cerebellum; blood / Top expressed in: facial motor nucleus; white adipose tissue; subcutaneous adipose tissue; stroma of bone marrow; olfactory epithelium; atrioventricular valve; spinal ganglia; anterior horn of spinal cord; pontine nuclei; atrium; More reference expression data
BioGPS	n/a
Gene ontology
Molecular function	protein binding; guanyl-nucleotide exchange factor activity
Cellular component	autophagosome; extracellular region; endosome; lysosome; cytoplasmic vesicle; nucleus; extracellular space; guanyl-nucleotide exchange factor complex; cytoplasm; Atg1/ULK1 kinase complex; axonal growth cone; main axon; P-body; membrane; axon; dendrite; growth cone; nuclear membrane; cell projection; perikaryon; cytoplasmic stress granule; neuron projection
Biological process	endocytosis; positive regulation of macroautophagy; regulation of autophagy; regulation of TORC1 signaling; autophagy; negative regulation of protein phosphorylation; stress granule assembly; axon extension; regulation of actin filament organization; late endosome to lysosome transport; regulation of autophagosome assembly; negative regulation of GTP binding
Sources:Amigo / QuickGO
Orthologs
Databases	NCBI: entry; OMA: entry
Species	Human	Mouse
Entrez	203228	73205
Ensembl	ENSG00000147894	ENSMUSG00000028300
UniProt	Q96LT7	Q6DFW0
RefSeq (mRNA)	NM_145005; NM_001256054; NM_018325	NM_001081343; NM_028466
RefSeq (protein)	NP_001242983; NP_060795; NP_659442	NP_001074812; NP_082742
Location (UCSC)	Chr 9: 27.54 – 27.57 Mb	Chr 4: 35.19 – 35.23 Mb
PubMed search
- Wikidata
View/Edit Human	View/Edit Mouse

C9orf72 (chromosome 9 open reading frame 72) is a biomolecular protein which in humans is encoded by the gene C9orf72.

The human C9orf72 gene is located on the short (p) arm of chromosome 9 open reading frame 72, from base pair 27,546,546 to base pair 27,573,866 (GRCh38). Its cytogenetic location is at 9p21.2.

The protein is found in many regions of the brain, in the cytoplasm of neurons as well as in presynaptic terminals. Disease-causing mutations in this gene were initially discovered by two independent research teams: one team led by Rosa Rademakers of the Mayo Clinic and the other team led by Bryan Traynor of the National Institutes of Health; their findings were published in October 2011. The mutations in C9orf72 are significant for being the first pathogenic mechanism identified as a genetic link between familial frontotemporal dementia (FTD) and amyotrophic lateral sclerosis (ALS). It is the most common mutation identified associated with familial FTD and/or ALS in Caucasians.

== Evolutionary history ==
In humans the cytogenetic location was discovered in 2006 on 9p21.2. The gene was discovered in 2011 and is highly conserved in primates, other mammals and across different species: For example, it is nearly identical to humans in chimpanzee and rhesus macaque (99.58%), mouse (98.13%), rat (97.71%) and rabbit (98.54%), and Xenopus (83.96%), as well as zebrafish (75.97%). Sequence similarity for the nematode Caenorhabditis elegans ortholog, ALFA-1, is low (14.71%), while there is no Drosophila ortholog.

Sequence analysis suggests that the C9ORF72 protein emerged early in eukaryotic evolution, and whereas most eukaryotes usually possess a single copy of the gene encoding the C9ORF72 protein, the eukaryotes Entamoeba and Trichomonas vaginalis possess multiple copies, suggestive of independent lineage-specific expansions in these species. The family is lost in most fungi (except Rhizopus) and plants.

The molecular location on chromosome 9 is base pairs 27,546,546 to 27,573,866.

== Function ==
C9ORF72 is predicted to be a full-length homologue of DENN proteins (where DENN stands for "differentially expressed in normal and neoplastic cells"). These proteins have a conserved DENN module consisting of an N-terminal longin domain, followed by the central DENN and C-terminal alpha-helical d-DENN domains. This led to DENNL72 being suggested as a new name for C9orf72.

Given the molecular role of known DENN modules, the C9ORF72-like proteins were predicted to function as guanine nucleotide exchange factors (GEF), which activate small GTPases, most likely a Rab. Studies have provided some evidence to confirm this: C9ORF72 was found to regulate endosomal trafficking and autophagy in neuronal cells and primary neurons. This suggested that certain aspects of the ALS and FTD disease pathology might result from haploinsufficiency of C9ORF72, leading to a defect in intracellular membrane traffic, which adds to neuronal damage from RNA-mediated and dipeptide toxicities by reducing function of microglia, the macrophage-like cells of the brain.

GTPase targets of a stable C9ORF72-SMCR8-WDR41 complex include the Rag GTPases that simulate mTORC1 and so regulate macro-autophagy. Also, C9ORF72 and SMCR8 regulate the function of lysosomes. Although the GTPase involved on lysosomes is not yet identified, it might feasibly be Rab7A, which along with Rab5A and Rab11A, is activated by C9ORF72-SMCR8-WDR41 functioning as a GEF.

As well as activating GTPases (GEF), the same C9ORF72-SMCR8-WDR41 complex is proposed to inactivate GTPases, i.e. as a GTPase-activating protein (GAP). This activity is proposed for Rag GTPases, paralleling the Rag-GAP activity of the FLCN-FNIP complex, which it resembles. In addition, the complex is a GAP for Rab8a and Rab11a, with cryo-EM identifying an arginine finger conserved between FLCN and SMCR8.

=== DNA damage response ===
Repeat sequence expansion mutations in C9orf72 that lead to neurodegeneration in ALS/FTD display dysfunction of the nucleolus and of R-loop formation. Such dysfunctions can lead to DNA damage. Motor neurons with C9orf72 mutations were found to activate the DNA damage response (DDR) as indicated by up-regulation of DDR markers. If the DDR is insufficient to repair these DNA damages, apoptosis of the motor neurons is the likely result.

=== Primary cilium and hedgehog signaling ===
A 2023 PNAS paper showed that C9orf72–SMCR8 (Smith-Magenis syndrome chromosome region 8) complex suppresses primary cilium growth as a RAB8A GAP (GTPase activating protein), establishing a link between C9orf72 function and the primary cilium and hedgehog signaling pathway. The C9orf72–SMCR8 complex suppressed the primary cilium in multiple tissues from mice, including but not limited to the brain, kidney, and spleen. Importantly, cells with C9orf72 or SMCR8 knocked out were more sensitive to hedgehog signaling, shedding light on a potential pathogenic mechanism related to the loss of C9orf72 function.

== Clinical significance ==
=== Mutations ===
The mutation of C9ORF72 is a hexanucleotide repeat expansion of the six letter string of nucleotides GGGGCC. In approximately half of all alleles, the hexanucleotide repeat is repeated twice, and in over 98% of the alleles its length is less than 17 repeats, but in people with the mutation, the repeat number is between 30 and thousands. There are three major theories about the way that the C9ORF72 mutation causes FTD and/or ALS. One theory is that accumulation of RNA that carry the expanded repeat in the nucleus and cytoplasm becomes toxic due to sequestration of RNA binding proteins. The other is that the lack of the C9ORF72 protein due to interference of the expanded repeat to its transcription and splicing, (haploinsufficiency) causes the diseases. Additionally, RNA transcribed from the C9ORF72 gene, containing expanded GGGGCC repeats, is translated through a non-ATG initiated mechanism, which is the same mechanism as other repeat disorders. This hexanucleotide variant of a trinucleotide repeat disorder produces five different dipeptides by RAN translation, these dipeptides aggregating to contribute to overall toxicity of the mutation. The GGGGCC repeat expansion in C9orf72 is also believed to compromise nucleocytoplasmic transport through several possible mechanisms.

=== FTD and ALS ===
The C9ORF72 mutation is the first mutation found to be a link between familial FTD and ALS. Numerous published studies have confirmed the commonality of the C9ORF72 repeat expansion in FTD and ALS, which are both diseases without cures that have affected millions of people. Frontotemporal dementia is the second most common form of early-onset dementia after Alzheimer's disease in people under the age of 65. Amyotrophic lateral sclerosis is also devastating; it is characterized by motor neuron degeneration that eventually causes respiratory failure with a median survival of three years after onset.

C9orf72 mutation is present in approximately 40% of familial ALS and 8–10% of sporadic ALS. It is currently the most common demonstrated mutation related to ALS—far more common than SOD1 or TDP-43.

While different mutations of various genes have been linked to different phenotypes of FTD in the past, C9orf72 specifically has been linked to behavioral variant FTD. Certain pathology in FTD caused by the C9orf72 mutation can also include:

- TDP-43 in all C9 carriers
- Ubiquitin-binding protein 62

C9ORF72 is specifically linked to familial ALS, which affects about 10% of ALS patients. Traditionally, familial and sporadic cases of ALS have been clinically indistinguishable, which has made diagnosis difficult. The identification of this gene will therefore help in the future diagnosis of familial ALS. Slow diagnosis is also common for FTD, which can often take up to a year with many patients initially misdiagnosed with another condition. Testing for a specific gene that is known to cause the diseases would help with faster diagnoses. Possibly most importantly, the identification of this hexanucleotide repeat expansion is an extremely promising avenue for possible future therapies of both familial FTD and familial ALS, once the mechanism and function of the C9ORF72 protein is better comprehended. Furthermore, present research is being done to see if there is a correlation between C9ORF72 and other neurological diseases, including Huntington's disease.

=== Heritability ===
It is possible that genetic anticipation may exist for this mutation. However, only 1 in 4 families exhibited significant anticipation in this study (n=63) It has been proposed that the amount of the repeat expansion increases with each successive generation, possibly causing the disease to be more severe in the next generation, showing onset up to a decade earlier with each successive generation after the carrier. The buildup of a repeat expansion with each generation is typically thought to occur because the DNA is unstable and therefore accumulates exponentially every time the gene is copied. No genetic evidence for this has yet been demonstrated for this mutation. There is also a demographic factor that should be considered in genetic predisposition, as some cohorts have found that there might be a founder effect for the C9orf72 mutation, which might have led to higher frequencies of the mutation in specific populations than others. Specifically this founder has been linked to Northern Europeans populations, namely Finland. Haplotype is a specific combination of multiple polymorphic sites along a chromosomal region that is inherited together in a block. The correlation between C9orf72 haplotypes and GGGGCC repeat length was examined in Caucasians. The repeat length is largely constant in all haplotypes harboring up to 5 repeat units, but not in haplotype J, which typically harbors 6 repeats. The highest level of GGGGCC repeat length diversity is observed in haplotype R, which most frequently harbors 8 repeats. The repeat length becomes more unstable with increasing length. The shortest documented GGGGCC repeat length change in subsequent generations was observed in a father and his daughter, who had 11 and 12 repeats, respectively. While all Caucasian C9orf72 patients are derived from a common founder that carried the R haplotype, it is unclear how many families in history experienced an expansion of repeat numbers from a normal length to a disease-associated length. In the Asian population, some C9orf72 ALS and FTD patients carry an alternative haplotype that is not related to the R haplotype.

=== Genetic testing ===
Since this mutation has been found to be the most common mutation identified in familial FTD and/or ALS, it is considered one of if not the most dependable candidates for genetic testing. Patients are considered eligible if the mother or father has had FTD and/or another family member has had ALS. There are also population and location risk factors in determining eligibility. Some studies have found that the mutation has a higher frequency in certain cohorts. Athena Diagnostics (Quest Diagnostics) announced in Spring 2012 the first clinically available testing service for detecting the hexanucleotide repeat expansion in the C9orf72 gene. Genetic counseling is recommended for the patients before a genetic test is ordered.

=== Implications for future therapies ===
Overall, the C9ORF72 mutation holds great promise for future therapies for familial FTD and/or ALS to be developed. Currently, there is focus on more research to be done on C9ORF72 to further understand the exact mechanisms involved in the cause of the diseases by this mutation. A clearer understanding of the exact pathogenic mechanism will aid in a more focused drug therapies. Possible drug targets currently include the repeat expansion itself as well as increasing levels of C9ORF72. Blocking the toxic gain of RNA foci to prevent RNA sequestration might be helpful as well as making up for the lack of C9ORF72. Either of these targets as well as a combination of them might be promising future targets in minimizing the effects of the C9ORF72 repeat expansion.

== Interactions ==
C9ORF72 has been shown to interact with:

- ELAVL1,
- UBC, and
- ADARB2

== See also ==
- Trinucleotide repeat disorder
- RAN translation
