= PPP2R2B =

Protein-coding gene in the species Homo sapiens

Identifiers
- Aliases: PPP2R2B, B55BETA, PP2AB55BETA, PP2ABBETA, PP2APR55B, PP2APR55BETA, PR2AB55BETA, PR2ABBETA, PR2APR55BETA, PR52B, PR55-BETA, PR55BETA, SCA12, protein phosphatase 2 regulatory subunit Bbeta
- External IDs: OMIM: 604325; MGI: 1920180; GeneCards: PPP2R2B

Gene location (Human)
Chr.	Chromosome 5 (human)
Band	5q32	Start	146,580,742 bp
Band	5q32	End	147,084,784 bp

Gene location (Mouse)
Chr.	Chromosome 18 (mouse)
Band	18|18 B3	Start	42,770,497 bp
Band	18|18 B3	End	43,216,192 bp
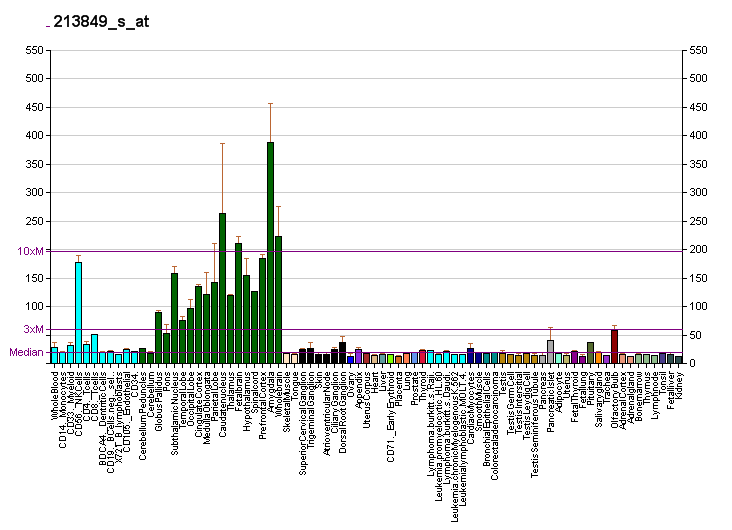

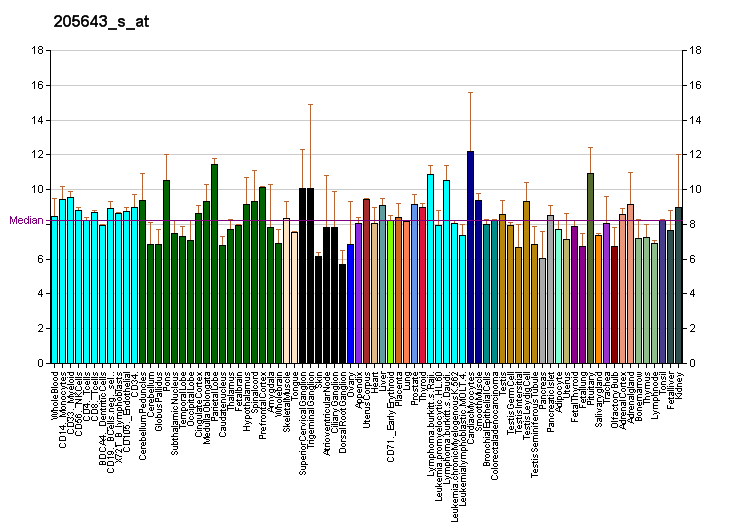
RNA expression pattern
Bgee	Human / Mouse (ortholog); Top expressed in: sperm; ganglionic eminence; prefrontal cortex; caudate nucleus; nucleus accumbens; Brodmann area 23; putamen; endothelial cell; primary visual cortex; dorsolateral prefrontal cortex / Top expressed in: entorhinal cortex; perirhinal cortex; neural layer of retina; CA3 field; primary motor cortex; anterior amygdaloid area; visual cortex; primary visual cortex; central gray substance of midbrain; subiculum; More reference expression data
BioGPS	More reference expression data
Gene ontology
Molecular function	protein binding; protein serine/threonine phosphatase activity; protein phosphatase regulator activity
Cellular component	cytoplasm; mitochondrial outer membrane; cytoskeleton; membrane; mitochondrion; protein phosphatase type 2A complex; cytosol
Biological process	apoptotic process; mitotic cell cycle; peptidyl-serine dephosphorylation; developmental process; regulation of phosphoprotein phosphatase activity
Sources:Amigo / QuickGO
Orthologs
Databases	NCBI: entry; OMA: entry
Species	Human	Mouse
Entrez	5521	72930
Ensembl	ENSG00000156475	ENSMUSG00000024500
UniProt	Q00005	Q6ZWR4
RefSeq (mRNA)	NM_001271899; NM_001271900; NM_001271948; NM_181674; NM_181675 NM_181676; NM_181677; NM_181678	NM_027531; NM_028392
RefSeq (protein)	NP_001258828; NP_001258829; NP_001258877; NP_858060; NP_858061 NP_858062; NP_858063; NP_858064	NP_082668; NP_081807; NP_001390894
Location (UCSC)	Chr 5: 146.58 – 147.08 Mb	Chr 18: 42.77 – 43.22 Mb
PubMed search
- Wikidata
View/Edit Human	View/Edit Mouse

Serine/threonine-protein phosphatase 2A 55 kDa regulatory subunit B beta isoform is an enzyme that in humans is encoded by the PPP2R2B gene.

The product of this gene belongs to the phosphatase 2regulatory subunit B family. Protein phosphatase 2 is one of the four major Ser/Thr phosphatases, and it is implicated in the negative control of cell growth and division. It consists of a common heteromeric core enzyme, which is composed of a catalytic subunit and a constant regulatory subunit, that associates with a variety of regulatory subunits. The B regulatory subunit might modulate substrate selectivity and catalytic activity. This gene encodes a beta isoform of the regulatory subunit B55 subfamily. Defects in the 5' UTR of this gene may cause a rare form of autosomal dominant spinocerebellar ataxia 12.
