= Ataxin 3 =

Protein-coding gene in the species Homo sapiens

ATXN3
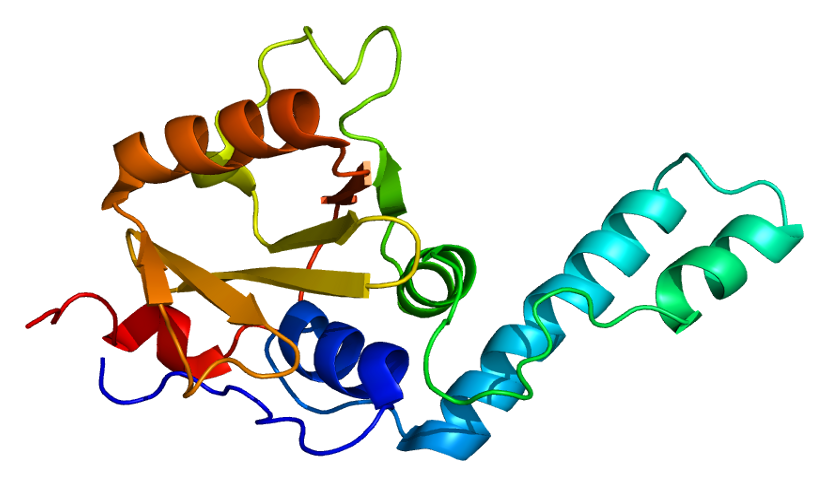

Identifiers
- Aliases: ATXN3, AT3, ATX3, JOS, MJD, MJD1, SCA3, Ataxin 3
- External IDs: OMIM: 607047; MGI: 1099442; GeneCards: ATXN3
Available structures
PDB	Ortholog search: PDBe RCSB
PDB	List of PDB id codes 1YZB, 2AGA, 2DOS, 2JRI, 2KLZ, 4WTH, 4YS9
Enzyme activity
EC #	BRENDA	ExPASy	KEGG	MetaCyc
3.4.19.12	↗	↗	↗	↗

Gene location (Human)
Chr.	Chromosome 14 (human)
Band	14q32.12	Start	92,044,496 bp
Band	14q32.12	End	92,106,621 bp

Gene location (Mouse)
Chr.	Chromosome 12 (mouse)
Band	12|12 E	Start	101,918,901 bp
Band	12|12 E	End	101,958,246 bp
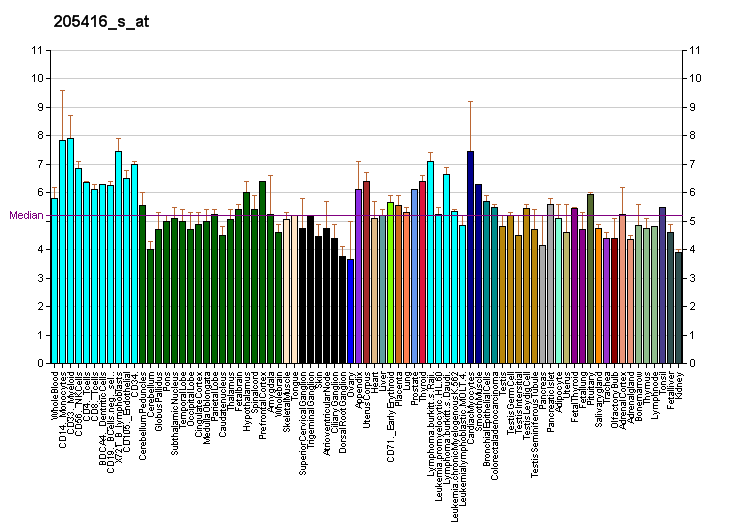

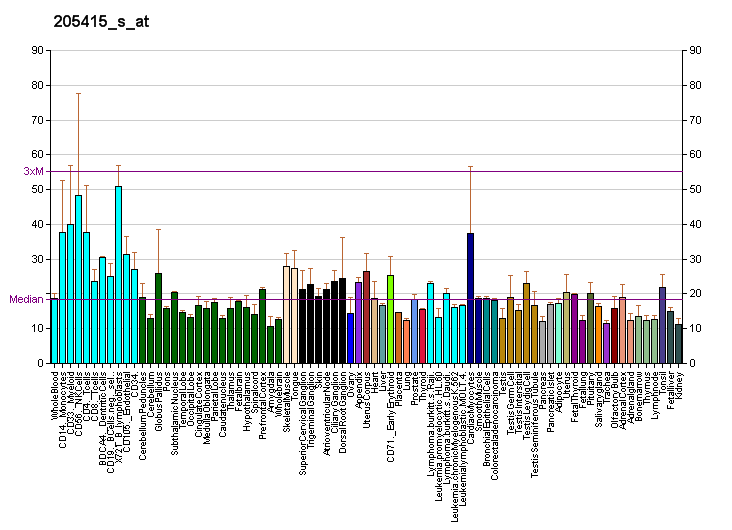
RNA expression pattern
Bgee	Human / Mouse (ortholog); Top expressed in: Achilles tendon; epithelium of colon; tendon of biceps brachii; gonad; endothelial cell; testicle; sural nerve; monocyte; pericardium; right uterine tube / Top expressed in: spermatid; morula; superior cervical ganglion; aortic valve; ascending aorta; interventricular septum; cumulus cell; spermatocyte; mesenteric lymph nodes; epithelium of small intestine; More reference expression data
BioGPS	More reference expression data
Gene ontology
Molecular function	Lys63-specific deubiquitinase activity; cysteine-type peptidase activity; ATPase binding; Lys48-specific deubiquitinase activity; peptidase activity; protein binding; identical protein binding; hydrolase activity; thiol-dependent deubiquitinase; ubiquitin protein ligase binding; histone deacetylase activity
Cellular component	endoplasmic reticulum membrane; nuclear matrix; nucleoplasm; nucleus; nucleolus; cytosol; plasma membrane; cytoplasm; mitochondrial matrix; mitochondrial membranes; nuclear inclusion body
Biological process	nucleotide-excision repair; regulation of transcription, DNA-templated; protein K48-linked deubiquitination; positive regulation of ERAD pathway; transcription, DNA-templated; nervous system development; proteolysis; protein K63-linked deubiquitination; intermediate filament cytoskeleton organization; protein localization to cytosolic proteasome complex involved in ERAD pathway; microtubule cytoskeleton organization; actin cytoskeleton organization; chemical synaptic transmission; protein deubiquitination; ubiquitin-dependent protein catabolic process; protein quality control for misfolded or incompletely synthesized proteins; regulation of cell-substrate adhesion; cellular response to heat; monoubiquitinated protein deubiquitination; proteasome-mediated ubiquitin-dependent protein catabolic process; cellular response to misfolded protein; exploration behavior; histone H3 deacetylation
Sources:Amigo / QuickGO
Orthologs
Databases	NCBI: entry; OMA: entry
Species	Human	Mouse
Entrez	4287	110616
Ensembl	ENSG00000066427	ENSMUSG00000021189
UniProt	P54252; Q4VBR4	Q9CVD2
RefSeq (mRNA)	NM_001024631; NM_001127696; NM_001127697; NM_001164774; NM_001164776 NM_001164777; NM_001164778; NM_001164779; NM_001164780; NM_001164781; NM_001164782; NM_004993; NM_030660	NM_001167914; NM_029705
RefSeq (protein)	NP_001121168; NP_001121169; NP_001158246; NP_001158248; NP_001158249 NP_001158250; NP_001158251; NP_001158252; NP_001158253; NP_001158254; NP_004984; NP_109376	NP_001161386; NP_083981
Location (UCSC)	Chr 14: 92.04 – 92.11 Mb	Chr 12: 101.92 – 101.96 Mb
PubMed search
- Wikidata
View/Edit Human	View/Edit Mouse

Ataxin-3 is a protein that in humans is encoded by the ATXN3 gene.

== Clinical significance ==
Machado–Joseph disease, also known as spinocerebellar ataxia type 3, is an autosomal dominant neurologic disorder. The protein encoded by the ATXN3 gene contains CAG repeats in the coding region, and the expansion of these repeats from the normal 13-36 to 68-79 is the cause of Machado–Joseph disease. This disorder is thus a trinucleotide repeat disorder type I known as a polyglutamine (PolyQ) disease. There is an inverse correlation between the age of onset and CAG repeat numbers. Alternatively spliced transcript variants encoding different isoforms have been described for this gene.

== Interactions ==
Ataxin 3 has been shown to interact with:

- RAD23A,
- RAD23B, and
- VCP.
