= Spt-Ada-Gcn5 acetyltransferase =

Spt-Ada-Gcn5 acetyltransferase (SAGA) complex is a multicomponent regulator of acetylation. It has been found that this complex is highly conserved between different organisms, such as humans, Drosophila, and yeast. This 15 subunit complex has been best characterized for its histone acetyltransferase activity (HAT). The acetylating activity has been found to occur in the lysine residues of the N-terminal tails of H3 and H2 histones. It has been found recently that this activity is actually a deubiquitination of a monoubiquitin that occurs in residue Lys 123 of the H2b histone and the acetylation of the H3 histone. The histone acetylation is mediated by the GCN5 histone acetyl transferase, while the deubiquitinating activity is mediated by a deubiquitinating module (DUBm), which is composed of 4 proteins, Ubp8 ubiquitin hydrolase, Sgf11, Sus1, and Sgf73. This DUB module is an independently folding subcomplex that is connected to the C-terminal tail of Sgf 73, Sgf73, as well as Sus1, also have a role in facilitating SAGA complex's role in nuclear export by binding to components of the nuclear pore complex. Even though Ubp8 has ubiquitin specific hydrolase (USP) domain, the protein remains inactive unless it is in complex with the other 3 DUBm proteins.
