= David L. Nelson =

American human geneticist (born 1956)

- Born: 1956 (age 69–70); Washington, D.C.
- Education: University of Virginia (BA); Massachusetts Institute of Technology MIT (PhD, Postdoc); Baylor College of Medicine (Postdoc)
- Awards: William Rosen Award (2000); Huntington Disease Society of America Leadership Award (200); Barbara Bowman Distinguished Geneticist (2010)
- Scientific career
- Fields: Molecular genetics, Human genome, Segmental duplication, Gene duplication
- Workplaces: University of Virginia; MIT Department of Biology; National Institute of Neurological Disorders and Stroke; Baylor College of Medicine
- Thesis: Chromosome Transfer of Introduced Selectable Markers: Use in Gene Mapping and Isolation (1984)
- Academic advisors: David Housman

David L. Nelson (born 1956) is an American human geneticist, currently an associate director at the Intellectual and Developmental Disabilities Research Center (1995), and professor at the Department of Molecular and Human Genetics at Baylor College of Medicine BCM since 1999. Since 2018, he is the director at the Cancer and Cell Biology Ph.D program, and the director of Integrative Molecular and Biomedical Sciences Ph.D since 2015 at BCM.

== Education and career ==
Nelson received a bachelor's degree from the University of Virginia in 1978 and received his PhD in molecular genetics from the Massachusetts Institute of Technology in 1984. He carried out his postdoctoral training at Massachusetts Institute of Technology (1984–1985) and National Institutes of Health before moving to Baylor College of Medicine.

Nelson joined the MIT Center for Cancer Research (CCR) group of David Housman at the Massachusetts Institute of Technology as a postdoctoral trainee (1986–1989). Nelson's work using introduced selectable genes expanded approaches to whole human genome mapping. From 1984 to 1985, in an intramural National Institutes of Health program at the laboratory of Robert Lazzarini, Nelson studied neuroscience and defined genes encoding neurofilament proteins. In 1986 he joined the C. Thomas Caskey laboratory at the Institute of Molecular Genetics, Baylor College of Medicine.

Applying PCR, a technique that allows rapid gene mapping and isolation of specific chromosomal regions, Nelson et al. identified chromosomal locations of large fragments of the human X chromosome; Nelson contributed to the human, mouse and fly reference sequences and was a co-discoverer of the mutation that causes Fragile X syndrome as an expansion of a trinucleotide repeat in the FMR1 gene. Nelson's contributions have led to the description of Lowe syndrome, and the identification of FMR2 for FRAXE syndrome.

== Contributions to science ==
=== Human Genome Project ===
Nelson's molecular techniques led to the development of genome mapping and sequencing and discovery of disease genes, contributing efforts to map and sequence of the human X chromosome. He was a leader in genetic and genomic analyses across all species.

=== Incontinentia Pigmenti (IP) ===
With a group of international collaborators, Nelson's research group was able to identify a recurrent, homology-driven deletion in the NEMO gene in Incontinentia pigmenti (IP), an X-linked genetic disease.

=== Fragile X syndrome ===
==== Unstable repeats as mutations in human genetic disease ====
Nelson and other collaborators at BMC, Emory University, and Erasmus University Rotterdam identified a massive expansion of CGG repeat (Trinucleotide repeat disorder) in FMR1. This was the first to be identified as the underlying mutations in human genetic disorders. Their findings in FMR1 explained the unusual inheritance in Fragile X syndrome and provided the principles for all subsequent unstable repeat disorders such as myotonic dystrophy, Huntington's disease, and amyotrophic lateral sclerosis.

==== FMR1 in neuronal function ====
By studying humans, mice, flies and yeast Nelson's research group has characterized the origins of instability in the repeat, the consequences of "premutation" length expansions, and the function of FMR1 and related FXR1 and FXR2. Nelson and his research group have defined roles for FMR1 and paralogs in circadian rhythm, energy metabolism, neuronal stem cell development, and microRNA function. Their research results are being used in research to define the role of FMR1 in development and potential treatment for these diseases in adulthood.

=== Fragile X tremor ataxia syndrome (FXTAS) ===
FXTAS individuals are cognitively unaffected until they reach their 60 or 70, when they show neural degeneration and nuclear inclusions during autopsy. Nelson's research group has used flies and mice to identify and characterize modifiers that showed that the CGG repeat is necessary and sufficient to affect mammalian neurons. Models developed by Nelson's research group have improved the understanding of mechanisms of this disease, including a role for RNA-binding functions such as TDP-43 and alterations in 5-Hydroxymethylcytosine.

== Public service ==
Nelson is a member of the Board of Directors of the American Society of Human Genetics, was its President in 2018, and served as Secretary from 2003 to 2009.

Nelson has served in many advisory boards and committees, including FRAXA Research Foundation Advisory Board (1999–present), National Fragile X Foundation Advisory Board (1999–present), March of Dimes Grants Review Board (2010–2015), Hungtinton Disease Society of America Steering Committee (1999–2010), United States NIH/NICHD Mental Retardation Review Committee (1998–2002), and US DOE Joint Genome Institute Advisory Board (1997–2000).

Nelson served on the editorial boards of eleven academic journals, including American Journal of Human Genetics, Mammalian Genome, Clinical Genetics (journal), and Genome Research.

== Patents ==
6824972. Diagnosis and treatment of medical conditions associated with defective NFkappa B (NF-κB) activation.

6107025. Diagnosis of the fragile X syndrome.

== Awards and honors ==
- Fellow, American Association for the Advancement of Science (2014)
- Barbara Bowman Distinguished Geneticist, Texas Genetics Society (2010)
- Leadership Award, Huntington's Disease Society of America (2000)
- William Rosen Award, National Fragile-X Foundation (2000)
