= CYFIP1 =

Protein-coding gene in the species Homo sapiens

Identifiers
- Aliases: CYFIP1, P140SRA-1, SHYC, SRA-1, SRA1, cytoplasmic FMR1 interacting protein 1
- External IDs: OMIM: 606322; MGI: 1338801; GeneCards: CYFIP1
Available structures
PDB	Ortholog search: PDBe RCSB
PDB	List of PDB id codes 3P8C, 4N78

Gene location (Human)
Chr.	Chromosome 15 (human)
Band	15q11.2	Start	22,867,052 bp
Band	15q11.2	End	22,981,063 bp

Gene location (Mouse)
Chr.	Chromosome 7 (mouse)
Band	7|7 B5	Start	55,491,493 bp
Band	7|7 B5	End	55,582,350 bp
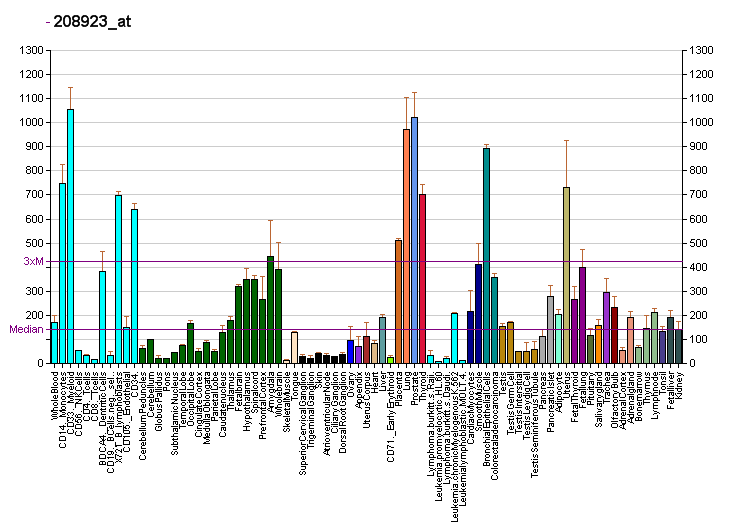
RNA expression pattern
Bgee	Human / Mouse (ortholog); Top expressed in: germinal epithelium; gingival epithelium; parietal pleura; visceral pleura; oral cavity; tibia; palpebral conjunctiva; skin of hip; mucosa of sigmoid colon; skin of thigh / Top expressed in: saccule; otic placode; sciatic nerve; otic vesicle; Ileal epithelium; dermis; stroma of bone marrow; endothelial cell of lymphatic vessel; skin of external ear; gastrula; More reference expression data
BioGPS	More reference expression data
Gene ontology
Molecular function	actin binding; protein-containing complex binding; actin filament binding; protein binding; RNA 7-methylguanosine cap binding; translation regulator activity
Cellular component	extracellular exosome; cytoplasm; synapse; cell projection; cell junction; cytosol; SCAR complex; focal adhesion; lamellipodium; perinuclear region of cytoplasm; ruffle; mRNA cap binding complex; neuron projection; extracellular region; filopodium tip; secretory granule lumen; specific granule lumen; soma; terminal bouton; dendritic spine; dendritic growth cone; axonal growth cone; excitatory synapse; central region of growth cone; peripheral region of growth cone; tertiary granule lumen; postsynapse
Biological process	Rac protein signal transduction; cognition; Fc-gamma receptor signaling pathway involved in phagocytosis; multicellular organism development; ruffle organization; axon extension; vascular endothelial growth factor receptor signaling pathway; nervous system development; regulation of cell shape; cell differentiation; positive regulation of Arp2/3 complex-mediated actin nucleation; lamellipodium assembly; cellular response to insulin stimulus; neutrophil degranulation; positive regulation of axon extension; positive regulation of axonogenesis; response to electrical stimulus; positive regulation of dendrite development; positive regulation of ruffle assembly; negative regulation of synaptic vesicle recycling; neuron projection development; positive regulation of neurotrophin TRK receptor signaling pathway; dendrite extension; regulation of translation; modification of synaptic structure; cell morphogenesis; axon guidance; cell projection assembly; regulation of translation at postsynapse, modulating synaptic transmission; regulation of modification of postsynaptic actin cytoskeleton
Sources:Amigo / QuickGO
Orthologs
Databases	NCBI: entry; OMA: entry
Species	Human	Mouse
Entrez	23191	20430
Ensembl	ENSG00000280618; ENSG00000273749; ENSG00000288461	ENSMUSG00000030447
UniProt	Q7L576	Q7TMB8
RefSeq (mRNA)	NM_001033028; NM_001287810; NM_014608; NM_001324119; NM_001324120 NM_001324122; NM_001324123; NM_001324124; NM_001324125; NM_001324126	NM_001164661; NM_001164662; NM_011370
RefSeq (protein)	NP_001028200; NP_001274739; NP_001311048; NP_001311049; NP_001311051 NP_001311052; NP_001311053; NP_001311054; NP_001311055; NP_055423	NP_001158133; NP_001158134; NP_035500
Location (UCSC)	Chr 15: 22.87 – 22.98 Mb	Chr 7: 55.49 – 55.58 Mb
PubMed search
- Wikidata
View/Edit Human	View/Edit Mouse

Cytoplasmic FMR1-interacting protein 1 is a protein that in humans is encoded by the CYFIP1 gene.

== Interactions ==
CYFIP1 has been shown to interact with FMR1, to the exclusion of FXR1 and FXR2. It also forms part of the WAVE regulatory complex (WRC), and based on the crystal structure of the WRC it is believed CYFIP1 provides the binding site for the complex to Rac1.

== Medical research applications ==
The CYFIP1 gene with haploinsufficiency may provide a model for the associated neuropsychiatric and neurological phenotypes of disorders such as autism and schizophrenia. With autism, a potential molecular link was identified between FMR1-FM and the genetic disorder dup(15q), in terms of the cytoplasmic FMR1 interacting protein 1 (CYFIP1) up regulated in those with the disorder.
