= Stephen Warren (geneticist) =

American geneticist and academic

- Born: 1953; East Detroit, Michigan
- Died: 6 June 2021 (aged 67–68)
- Title: William Patterson Timmie Professor of Human Genetics; Charles Howard Candler Chair of Human Genetics

Academic background
- Education: Michigan State University

Academic work
- Institutions: Emory University

Stephen T. Warren was an American geneticist and academic. He was the William Patterson Timmie Professor of Human Genetics and the Charles Howard Candler Chair of Human Genetics. He was the former founding chairman of the Department of Human Genetics at Emory University School of Medicine. He was an Investigator with the Howard Hughes Medical Institute from 1991 until 2002, when he resigned to found the Human Genetics department. Warren is well known for his work in the field of Human Genetics. His research was focused on the mechanistic understanding of fragile X syndrome, a leading cause of inherited developmental disability and autism. In 2020, Warren stepped down as department chair after 20 years in that position.

In 2003, Warren was an inaugural inductee of the National Institute of Child Health and Human Development’s Hall of Honor for the "identification of triplet repeat expansion as the cause of fragile X syndrome and as an entirely new inherited mechanism of genetic disease". He was elected to the National Academy of Medicine in 2004, the National Academy of Sciences in 2011 and the American Academy of Arts and Sciences in 2015. He is a diplomat of the American Board of Medical Genetics.

Warren is the former editor-in-chief of the American Journal of Human Genetics and former president of the American Society of Human Genetics.

== Education ==
Warren was born in 1953 and was raised in East Detroit, Michigan (now Eastpointe, Michigan). He began his undergraduate studies at Michigan State University in 1972 and graduated with a B.S. in Zoology in 1976. While a freshman, he began his involvement in medical genetics by volunteering in the clinical genetics diagnostic laboratory with James Higgins where he continued to work throughout his undergraduate studies. During his summer breaks he worked with geneticists Lester Weiss and Gene Jackson at Henry Ford Hospital in Detroit.

Warren continued his graduate studies at Michigan State University, completing his Ph.D. in Human Genetics in 1981. His doctoral Advisor was James Trosko. He completed his post graduate training at the University of Illinois at Chicago at the Center for Genetics and at the European Molecular Biology Laboratory Heidelberg.

== Career ==
Following his postgraduate fellowship, he joined Emory University as an assistant professor in the departments of Biochemistry and Pediatrics (Medical Genetics) in 1985. He was promoted to associate professor in 1991 and full professor in 1993.

Throughout his career, Warren has been involved with the American Society of Human Genetics in various capacities, becoming the president of the society in 2006. In 1999, he won the William Allan Award, the highest honor of the American Society of Human Genetics.

=== Research and work ===
His doctoral dissertation was entitled "Bloom syndrome as a human mutator mutation". He published 12 manuscripts during his doctoral training. Warren's postdoctoral studies were focused on human molecular genetics and he first began his studies on fragile X syndrome. He made somatic cell hybrids isolating the human fragile X chromosome in rodent cells and devised a strategy to molecular clone the DNA responsible for the syndrome.

He began his molecular experiments to implement this strategy in 1985 when he established his own laboratory at Emory University. Using his somatic cells hybrids, Warren led an international group, including his longtime collaborator David L. Nelson at Baylor College of Medicine, that isolated the FMR1 gene responsible for fragile X syndrome in 1991. The cloning of this locus also uncovered, for the first time, a trinucleotide repeat expansion mutation, a mechanism now known to be responsible for dozens of genetic diseases.

Warren and collaborators subsequently demonstrated that the expanded FMR1 repeat in patients leads to transcriptional suppression and the absence of the encoded protein, FMRP. He has shown that this protein is a selective RNA-binding protein and identified FMRP associated mRNAs. Subsequent research in his laboratory demonstrated that FMRP is involved in the regulation of local protein synthesis at the synapse and that in the absence of FMRP, the FMRP-associated mRNAs are over translated, in an activity-dependent manner.

== Awards and honors ==
- 1982 - National Institutes of Health Individual Postdoctoral Fellowship
- 1987 - The Albert E. Levy Science Faculty Research Award, Emory University
- 1992 - Founding Fellow, American College of Medical Genetics
- 1996 - NARSAD Distinguished Investigator Award
- 1996 - 2006 - National Institutes of Health MERIT award
- 1996 - William Rosen Research Award, The National Fragile X Foundation
- 1999 - William Allan Award, The American Society of Human Genetics
- 2003 - Inaugural Inductee, National Institute of Child Health & Human Development Hall of Honor
- 2004 - Elected to Institute of Medicine of the National Academies
- 2006 - William & Enid Rosen Research Award, The National Fragile X Foundation
- 2006 - Honorary Chairman, The 10th International Fragile X Conference
- 2007 - Michigan State University College of Natural Science Outstanding Alumni Award
- 2008 - The Herbert & Esther Bennett Brandwein Award in Genetic Research of the University of Connecticut
- 2008 - Champion for Babies Award, March of Dime Foundation
- 2008 - Norman Saunder's Jacob's Ladder International Research Prize
- 2009 - Frontiers in Clinical Neuroscience Award, American Academy of Neurology
- 2011 - March of Dimes/Colonel Harland Sanders Award for lifetime achievement
- 2011 - Dean's Distinguished Faculty Award, Emory University School of Medicine
- 2011 - Elected, National Academy of Sciences
- 2013 - Emory University Distinguished Faculty Award
- 2013 - Association for Molecular Pathology Award for Excellence in Molecular Diagnostics
- 2015 - Elected, American Academy of Arts and Sciences

== Publications ==
=== Selected papers ===
- Warren, ST, Zhang, F, Licameli. GR and Peters, JF: The fragile X site in somatic cell hybrids: An approach for molecular cloning of fragile sites. Science 237:420-423 (1987).
- Verkerk, AJMH, Pieretti, M, Sutcliffe, JS, Fu, Y-H, Kuhl, DPA, Pizzuti, A, Reiner, O, Richards, S, Victoria, MF, Zhang, F, Eussen, BE, van Ommen, GLB, Blonden, LAJ, Riggins, GJ, Chastain, JL, Kunst, CB, Gakljaard, H, Caskey, CT, Nelson, DL, Oostra, BA and Warren, ST: Identification of a gene (FMR-1) containing a CGG repeat coincident with a breakpoint cluster region exhibiting length variation in fragile X syndrome. Cell 65:905-914 (1991).
- Ashley, CT, Wilkinson, KD, Reines, D and Warren, ST: FMR1 protein: Conserved RNP family domains and selective RNA binding. Science 262:563-566 (1993).
- Kunst CB and Warren, ST: Cryptic and polar variation of the fragile X repeat could result in predisposing normal alleles. Cell 77:853-861 (1994).
- Feng, Y, Absher, D, Eberhart, DE, Brown, V, Malter, HE and Warren, ST: FMRP associates with polyribosomes as an mRNP and the I304N mutation of severe fragile X syndrome abolishes this association. Molecular Cell 1:109-118 (1997).
- Brown, V, Jin, P, Ceman, S, Darnell, JC, O’Donnell, WT, Tenenbaum, SA, Jin, X, Feng, Y, Wilkinson, KD, Keene, JD, Darenell, RB and Warren, ST: Microarray identification of FMRP-associated brain mRNAs and altered mRNA translational profiles in fragile X syndrome. Cell 107:477-487 (2001).
- Bear, MF, Huber, KM and Warren, ST: The mGluR theory of fragile X mental retardation. Trends in Neurosciences 27:370-377 (2004).
- Jin, P, Duan, R, Qurashi, A, Qin, Y, Tian, D, Rosser, TC, Liu, H, Feng, Y and Warren, ST: Pur binds to rCGG repeats and modulated repeat-mediated neurodegeneration in a Drosophila model of fragile X tremor/ataxia syndrome. Neuron 55:556-564 (2007).
- Nakamoto, M, Nalavadi, V, Epstein, MP, Narayanan, U, Bassell, GJ and Warren, ST: Fragile X mental retardation protein deficiency leads to spontaneous mGluR5-dependent internalization of AMPA receptors. Proceedings of the National Academy of Sciences, USA 104:15537-15542 (2007).
- Chang, S, Bray, SM, Li, Z, Zarnescu, DC, He, C, Jin, P and Warren, ST: Identification of small molecules rescuing morphological, biochemical, and behavioral phenotypes of fragile X syndrome in Drosophila. Nature Chemical-Biology 4:256-263 (2008).

=== Books ===
- Davies, KE and Warren, ST (Editors): Genome Analysis Volume 7: Genome Rearrangement and Stability. (Cold Spring Harbor Laboratory Press, New York). pp. 165 (1993).
- Wells, RD and Warren, ST (Editors): Genetic Instabilities and Hereditary Neurological Diseases. (Academic Press, San Diego). pp. 829 (1998).
