= NUFIP2 =

Protein-coding gene in the species Homo sapiens

Identifiers
- Aliases: NUFIP2, 182-FIP, 82-FIP, FIP-82, PIG1, FMR1 interacting protein 2, nuclear FMR1 interacting protein 2, NUFP2
- External IDs: OMIM: 609356; MGI: 1915814; GeneCards: NUFIP2

Gene location (Human)
Chr.	Chromosome 17 (human)
Band	17q11.2	Start	29,255,839 bp
Band	17q11.2	End	29,294,148 bp

Gene location (Mouse)
Chr.	Chromosome 11 (mouse)
Band	11|11 B5	Start	77,576,981 bp
Band	11|11 B5	End	77,632,747 bp
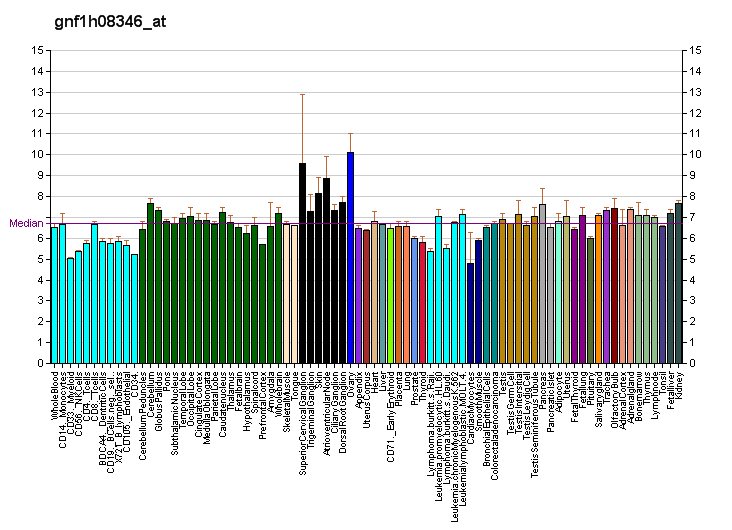
RNA expression pattern
Bgee	Human / Mouse (ortholog); Top expressed in: caput epididymis; corpus epididymis; tail of epididymis; cardiac muscle tissue of right atrium; secondary oocyte; tibialis anterior muscle; trabecular bone; pancreatic epithelial cell; mucosa of ileum; deltoid muscle / Top expressed in: hand; zygote; body of femur; pineal gland; tail of embryo; umbilical cord; human fetus; secondary oocyte; foot; epithelium of small intestine; More reference expression data
BioGPS	More reference expression data
Orthologs
Databases	NCBI: entry; OMA: entry
Species	Human	Mouse
Entrez	57532	68564
Ensembl	ENSG00000108256	ENSMUSG00000037857
UniProt	Q7Z417	Q5F2E7
RefSeq (mRNA)	NM_020772	NM_001024205
RefSeq (protein)	NP_065823; NP_065823.1	NP_001019376
Location (UCSC)	Chr 17: 29.26 – 29.29 Mb	Chr 11: 77.58 – 77.63 Mb
PubMed search
- Wikidata
View/Edit Human	View/Edit Mouse

Nuclear fragile X mental retardation-interacting protein 2 is a protein that in humans is encoded by the NUFIP2 gene.

== Interactions ==
NUFIP2 has been shown to interact with FMR1 and Roquin-1.
