= Bruce R. Korf =

American geneticist

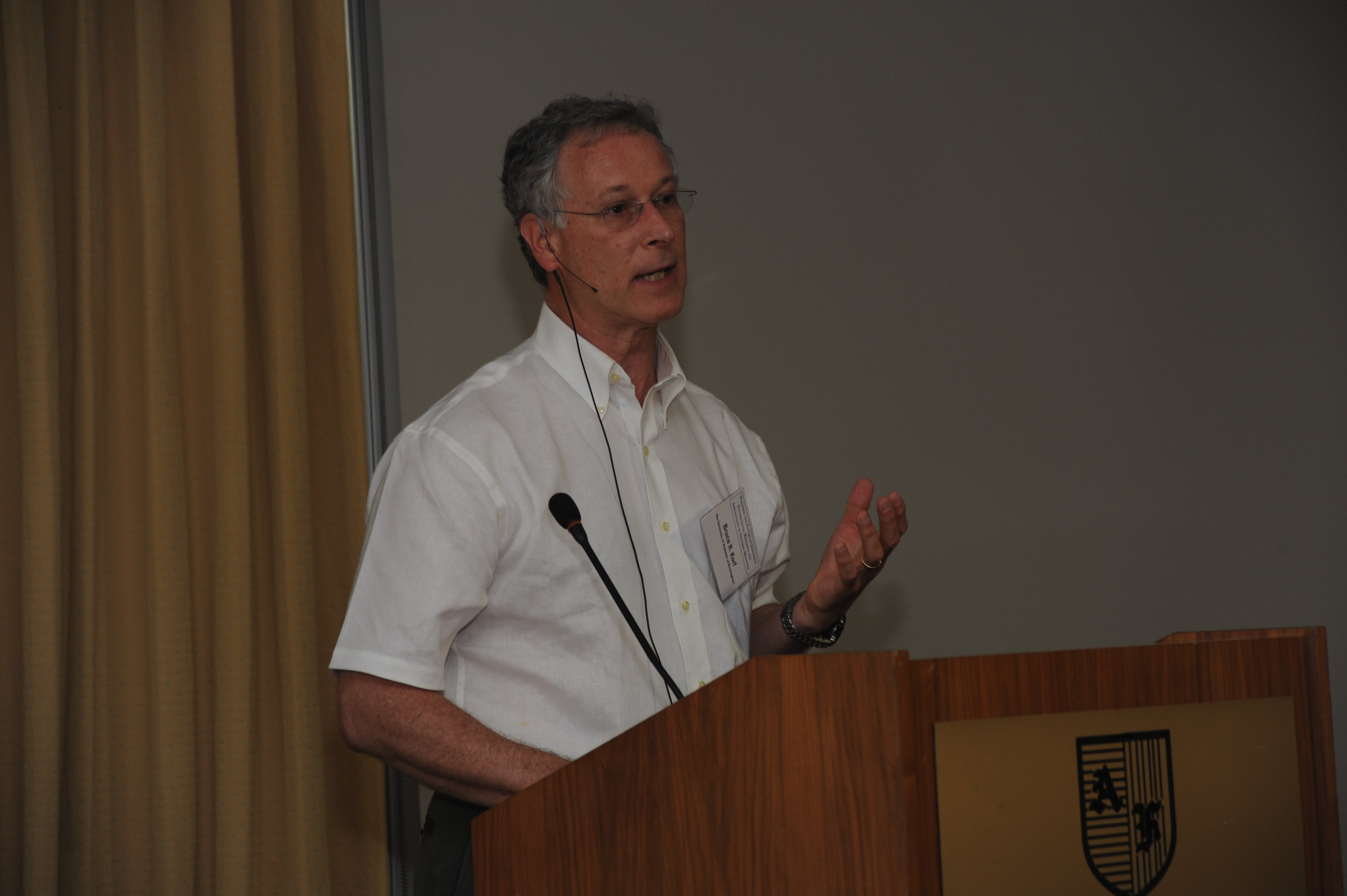
- Korf in 2010
- Born: 1952 (age 73–74)
- Spouse: Michele Janet Weiss (m. 1975)

Academic background
- Education: BA, 1974, Cornell University; PhD, genetics and cell biology, 1979, Rockefeller University; MD, Weill Cornell Medicine
- Thesis: Probing mitotic chromosome structure and arrangement by micromanipulation. (1979)

Bruce Richard Korf (born 1952) is a medical geneticist at the University of Alabama at Birmingham. In April 2009, he began a two-year term as president of the American College of Medical Genetics (ACMG), a professional organization.

== Early life and education ==
Korf was born in 1952. Growing up in Matawan, New Jersey, he graduated from Matawan Regional High School in 1970 as valedictorian. During his senior year, Korf served as chairman of the board of the Scientific Research Organization and president of the Library Club. He was also a member of the National Honor Society and a Student Council representative.

Korf completed his Bachelor of Arts degree in 1974 from Cornell University before enrolling at Rockefeller University for his PhD in genetics and cell biology. Following this, he rejoined Cornell for his medical degree and completed his residency and in pediatrics, pediatric neurology, and genetics at Boston Children's Hospital.

== Career ==
=== Harvard University ===
Upon completing his PhD, Korf served as clinical director in the Division of Genetics at Children's Hospital and as the medical director of the Harvard-Partners Center for Genetics and Genomics. He was also an associate professor of neurology at Harvard Medical School and directed postdoctoral training in medical and laboratory genetics at hospitals affiliated with Harvard. During his tenure at Harvard, Korf authored Human Genetics: A Problem-Based Approach, an introductory graduate textbook used by medical students and genetic counselors. He also co-authored the Medical Genetics at a Glance, and was an editor of Emery and Rimoin's Principles and Practice of Medical Genetics.

=== UAB ===
Korf left Harvard in 2003 to become the Wayne H. Finley and Sara Crews Finley Chair of Medical Genetics at University of Alabama at Birmingham (UAB). Upon joining the faculty, he was also named the new Chairman of the Medical Affairs Committee for the National Neurofibromatosis Foundation. Following this, Korf was named president-elect of the American College of Medical Genetics and Genomics. While serving in this role, Korf received the 2009 Award for Excellence in Human Genetics Education from the American Society for Human Genetics for his mentoring efforts.

As a result of his impact in the field of human and medical genetics, Korf was elected a Fellow of the American Association for the Advancement of Science in 2014. Two years later, Korf was appointed editor-in-chief of the American Journal of Human Genetics after serving as a member of the editorial board from 2003 to 2005. Following this appointment, he was also appointed Chief Genomics Officer for UAB Medicine to oversee clinical implementations of precision medicine. In 2019, Korf was named associate dean for Genomic Medicine at UAB.

== Personal life ==
Korf married his wife, Michele Janet Weiss, in 1975. They have two daughters, Jessica and Katie.
