= Fragile X-associated primary ovarian insufficiency =

- Other names: premature ovarian failure
- Pronunciation: fax-poi
- Specialty: Genetics, reproductive endocrinology
- Symptoms: Elevated follicle stimulating hormone (FSH) and loss of menstrual cycles before age 40
- Causes: FMR1 premutation
- Diagnostic method: genetic testing
- Treatment: infertility: may use assisted reproductive technologies risk of FMR1 premutation expansion: genetic testing for CGG repeat expansion in embryos or fetuses

Fragile X-associated primary ovarian insufficiency (FXPOI) is the most common genetic cause of premature ovarian failure in women with a normal karyotype 46, XX. The expansion of a CGG repeat in the 5' untranslated region of the FMR1 gene from the normal range of 5-45 repeats to the premutation range of 55-199 CGGs leads to risk of FXPOI for ovary-bearing individuals. About 1:150-1:200 women in the US population carry a premutation. Women who carry an FMR1 premutation have a roughly 20% risk of being diagnosed with FXPOI, compared to 1% for the general population, and an 8-15% risk of developing the neurogenerative tremor/ataxia disorder (FXTAS). FMR1 premutation women are also at increased risk of having a child with a CGG repeat that is expanded to >200 repeats (a full mutation). Individuals with a full mutation, unlike the premutation, produce little to no mRNA or protein from the FMR1 gene and have fragile X syndrome as a result.

== Clinical diagnosis ==
Primary ovarian insufficiency requires that a diagnosis be made before the age of 40, since it is considered premature relative to the average age of menopause of 51 in the US. The two criteria are the repeated elevation of the follicle stimulating hormone (FSH), which increases dramatically when a woman enters menopause, and the loss of menstruation for at least 4–6 months. In FMR1 premutation carriers, the likelihood of receiving a clinical diagnosis of FXPOI is about 20% and increased FSH levels and altered menstrual cycles become particularly evident between 30 and 40 years of age. Even if menses are lost, women diagnosed with FXPOI may experience a spontaneous "escape" ovulation. This means that there is some chance for conception, around 10%, even if menstruation has been absent for extended periods in women with FXPOI. Women planning to conceive before the cessation of periods are often encouraged to consult a genetic counselor or medical geneticist to understand their risk for having a child with fragile X syndrome.

== Genetics ==
The FMR1 premutation is commonly identified using reflexive genetic testing after identification of a child with fragile X syndrome found in a family. This genetic diagnosis accounts for 10-15% of women who will receive an FXPOI diagnosis. Women may also experience infertility and receive genetic testing in the course of reproductive care. Roughly 1-3% of FXPOI cases are identified through this process.

FXPOI is the most common known genetic cause of ovarian insufficiency for women with a normal chromosome number (46, XX). It accounts for 5-10% of these cases of premature ovarian failure. Not all women who are carriers for an FMR1 premutation allele, an expansion of the CGG repeat in the FMR1 gene to 55-199 repeats, will be diagnosed with FXPOI. About 20% of premutation carriers will be diagnosed, but this risk represents a significant increase over the general population who have a roughly 1% risk of POI. Women with the highest risk of POI have 70-100 CGG repeats, meaning there is a non-linear association between CGG-repeat size and FXPOI risk. This relationship is different than the linear association seen between CGG repeat size and age of onset of FXTAS. Other variations in premutation alleles, like AGG interruptions within the CGG repeats, are not correlated with risk of a FXPOI diagnosis. The AGG interruptions are correlated with the risk that the premutation-length allele could expand in the oocyte, or egg cell, and lead to a child with fragile X syndrome.

== Pathophysiology ==
In the context of FXPOI, two main hypotheses explain the underlying molecular mechanisms. One proposes an mRNA toxic gain-of-function effect, while the other suggests a protein-based mechanism. In the latter, repeat-associated non-AUG (RAN) translation produces an abnormal protein, FMRpolyG, which may contribute to cellular dysfunction.

== Risk of developing other premutation-related diagnoses ==
Though the greatest risks for female carriers of an FMR1 premutation are developing POI and having a child with fragile X syndrome, there are other possible neurological and neuropsychiatric conditions that may occur. Roughly 8-15% of female premutation carriers will develop the late-onset neurodegenerative tremor/ataxia disorder FXTAS. More recently, increased interest in neurological features and cognition of female premutation carriers has suggested a broader range of neuropsychiatric conditions associated with premutation-sized CGG repeats. Women with an FMR1 premutation exhibit higher incidences of depression, anxiety, autoimmune dysfunction, and neuromuscular pain. The prevalence of depression and anxiety in premutation females is, notably, higher than that observed in premutation males. Interpretation of studies that examine women with a premutation, who may have complex and challenging needs, is difficult since it is unclear whether the premutation leads to increased anxiety and depression or it is increased environmental stressors within the home. Research to understand these differences between males and females with the same genetic change is developing, but there are no studies that point to a definitive driver of these differences.

=== Expansion of a premutation to full mutation ===
An additional challenge for women with an FMR1 premutation is determining the risk for having a child with fragile X syndrome. Epidemiological data show that the risk of a premutation allele (55-199 CGGs) expanding to a full mutation (>200 CGGs) increases as the length of the CGG tract grows. This risk assessment for expansion to a full mutation is critical for women, but not men, with a premutation since the premutation allele in males does not show large expansion and transmission through generations. Expansion from a premutation to full mutation only occurs within the egg cells of a female premutation carrier. Additional factors influencing the stability of FMR1 premutation alleles are the presence of AGG interruptions. The loss of 1 or 2 AGG interruptions in the 5' region of the CGG repeat allele leads to increased likelihood that a premutation will expand to a full mutation from one generation to the next. Studies have also indicated that increasing maternal age may be a contributor to increased risk of expansion of a premutation to a full mutation, but the molecular mechanism through which this expansion process occurs are not yet understood.

== Resources ==
Individuals with FMR1-related disorders and families have access to several communities to find support groups and information about ongoing research and new therapies. Concise information designed for patients, families, or people outside of medical fields is available. The National Fragile X Foundation raises awareness about fragile X-associated disorders, research, and treatments. The FRAXA Research Foundation is another resource for families and is primarily focused on funding and helping amplify research and treatment options for fragile X to the community.
