= American Journal of Human Genetics =

- Discipline: Human genetics
- Language: English
- Edited by: Bruce R. Korf

Publication details
- History: 1948–present Vol. I, Issue 1, Sept. 1949
- Publisher: Cell Press on behalf of the American Society of Human Genetics
- Frequency: Monthly since 1986; bimonthly from 1965 to 1985; quarterly from 1949 to 1964
- Impact factor: 8.1 (2024)

Standard abbreviations
- ISO 4: Am. J. Hum. Genet.

Indexing
- CODEN: AJHGAG
- ISSN: 0002-9297
- LCCN: 52064295
- OCLC no.: 1480145

Links
- Journal homepage; Online access; Online archive

The American Journal of Human Genetics is a monthly peer-reviewed scientific journal in the field of human genetics. It was established in 1948 by the American Society of Human Genetics and covers all aspects of heredity in humans, including the application of genetics in medicine and public policy, as well as the related areas of molecular and cell biology. According to the Journal Citation Reports, the journal has a 2019 impact factor of 10.502. The journal is published by Cell Press an imprint of Elsevier. Bruce R. Korf became the editor-in-chief in the winter of 2017–2018.

== Abstracting and indexing ==
The journal is indexed in major bibliographic databases, including:

- MEDLINE / PubMed
- Science Citation Index Expanded
- Scopus

== Past editors-in-chief ==
- 1948–1951 — Charles W. Cotterham
- 1952–1954 — Herluf H. Strandskov (1898–1984)
- 1955 — Laurence H. Snyder
- 1956–1961 — Arthur G. Steinberg
- 1962–1963 — C. Nash Herndon
- 1964–1969 — H. Eldon Sutton
- 1970–1975 — Arno Motulsky
- 1976–1978 — William J. Mellman
- 1979–1986 — David E. Comings
- 1986–1993 — Charles J. Epstein
- 1993–1999 — Peter H. Byers
- 1999–2005 — Stephen T. Warren
- 2005–2011 — Cynthia C. Morton
- 2011–2017 — David L. Nelson

== See also ==
- American Journal of Medical Genetics
