= Leucine carboxyl methyltransferase 1 =

Enzyme found in humans

LCMT1
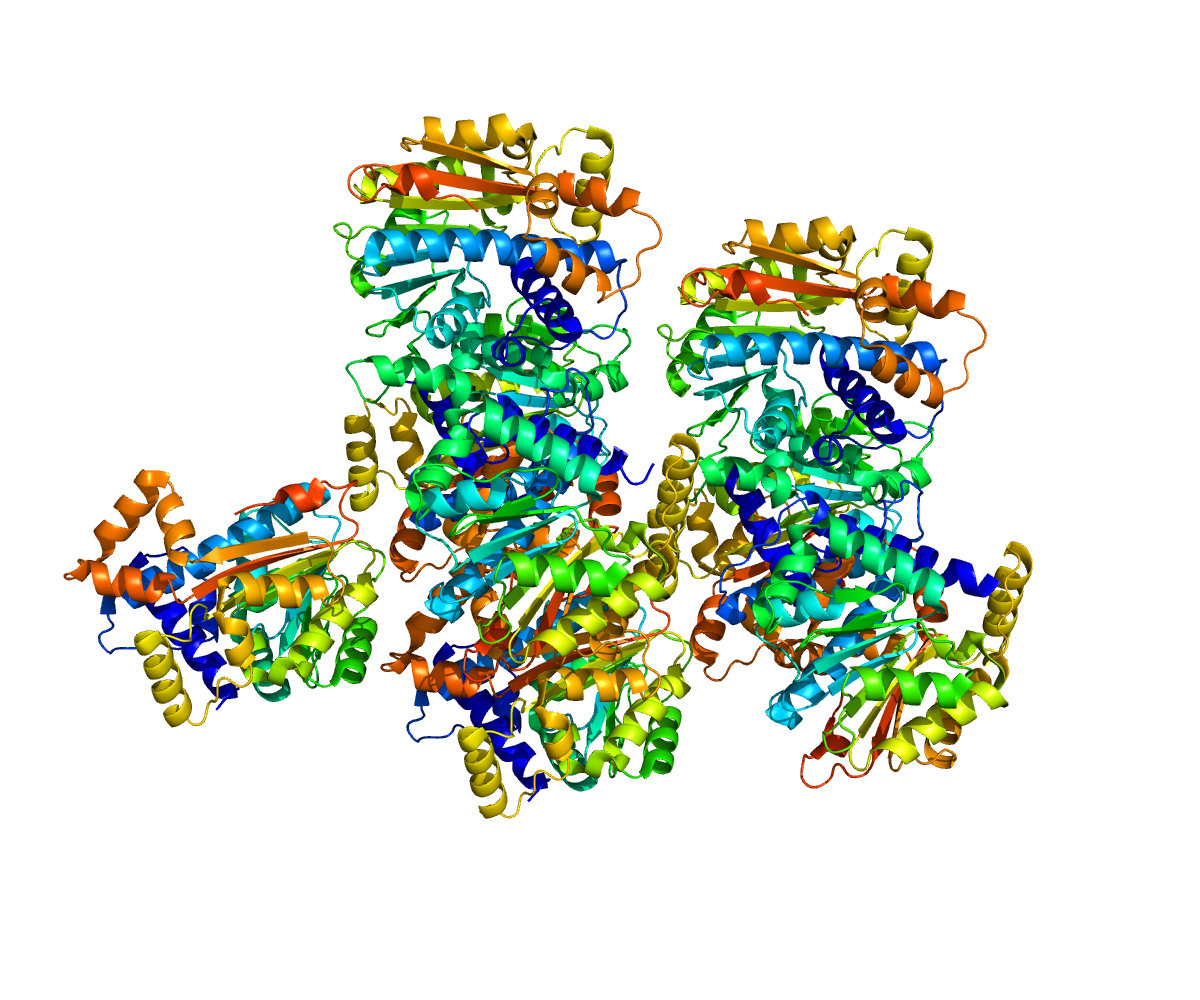

Identifiers
- Aliases: LCMT1, LCMT, PPMT1, CGI-68, leucine carboxyl methyltransferase 1
- External IDs: OMIM: 610286; MGI: 1353593; GeneCards: LCMT1
Available structures
PDB	Human UniProt search: PDBe RCSB
PDB	List of PDB id codes 3IEI, 3O7W, 3P71
Enzyme activity
EC #	BRENDA	ExPASy	KEGG	MetaCyc
2.1.1.233	↗	↗	↗	↗

Gene location (Human)
Chr.	Chromosome 16 (human)
Band	16p12.1	Start	25,111,731 bp
Band	16p12.1	End	25,178,231 bp

Gene location (Mouse)
Chr.	Chromosome 7 (mouse)
Band	7|7 F3	Start	122,969,007 bp
Band	7|7 F3	End	123,029,581 bp
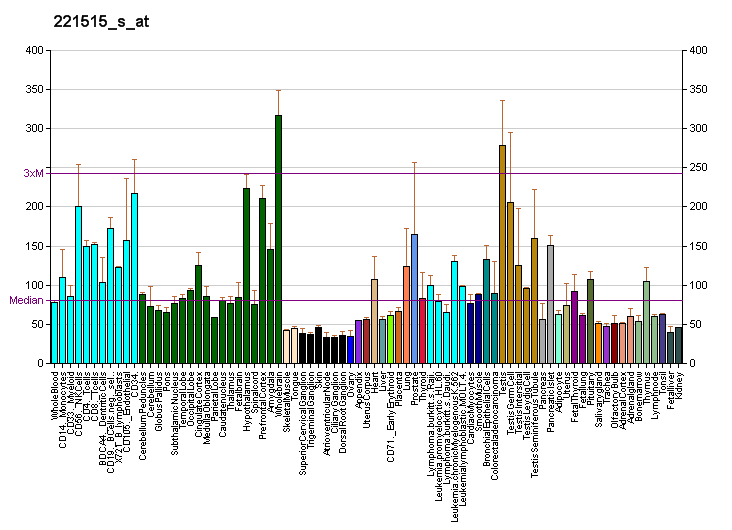
RNA expression pattern
Bgee	Human / Mouse (ortholog); Top expressed in: middle temporal gyrus; body of pancreas; prefrontal cortex; oocyte; nucleus accumbens; right frontal lobe; gonad; pons; Brodmann area 23; anterior cingulate cortex / Top expressed in: lacrimal gland; dentate gyrus of hippocampal formation granule cell; Region I of hippocampus proper; ventromedial nucleus; medial ganglionic eminence; anterior amygdaloid area; nucleus accumbens; nucleus of stria terminalis; dorsomedial hypothalamic nucleus; superior frontal gyrus; More reference expression data
BioGPS	More reference expression data
Gene ontology
Molecular function	methyltransferase activity; protein methyltransferase activity; S-adenosylmethionine-dependent methyltransferase activity; transferase activity; protein binding; protein C-terminal carboxyl O-methyltransferase activity; protein C-terminal leucine carboxyl O-methyltransferase activity
Cellular component	cytosol; nucleoplasm
Biological process	regulation of mitotic cell cycle spindle assembly checkpoint; methylation; C-terminal protein methylation; regulation of glucose metabolic process; regulation of apoptotic process; negative regulation of protein-containing complex assembly; protein methylation; G2/M transition of mitotic cell cycle
Sources:Amigo / QuickGO
Orthologs
Databases	NCBI: entry; OMA: entry
Species	Human	Mouse
Entrez	51451	30949
Ensembl	ENSG00000205629	ENSMUSG00000030763
UniProt	Q9UIC8	n/a
RefSeq (mRNA)	NM_001032391; NM_016309; NM_016015	NM_025304; NM_001355050
RefSeq (protein)	NP_001027563; NP_057393	n/a
Location (UCSC)	Chr 16: 25.11 – 25.18 Mb	Chr 7: 122.97 – 123.03 Mb
PubMed search
- Wikidata
View/Edit Human	View/Edit Mouse

Leucine carboxyl methyltransferase 1 is an enzyme that in humans is encoded by the LCMT1 gene.

== Interactions ==
LCMT1 has been shown to interact with FXR2.
