= Fragile X-associated tremor/ataxia syndrome =

Neurodegenerative disease

- Abbreviation: FXTAS
- Pronunciation: "FAX-tass"
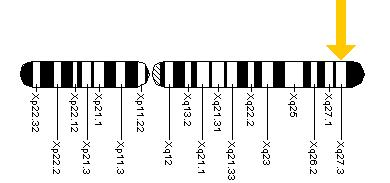
- Location of the FMR1 gene Location of the FMR1 gene
- Specialty: Neurology, Movement Disorders
- Symptoms: intention tremor, ataxia, and parkinsonism
- Prevalence: In patients over 50 with FMR1 premutation: 30-40% (males); 8-15% (females)
- Onset: Late-onset, diagnosed in patients >50 years
- Diagnosis: Presentation, family history, genetic testing, and MRI

Fragile X-associated tremor/ataxia syndrome (FXTAS) is a late-onset neurodegenerative disorder most frequently seen in male premutation carriers of Fragile X syndrome (FXS) over the age of 50. The main clinical features of FXTAS include problems of movement with cerebellar gait ataxia and action tremor. Associated features include parkinsonism, cognitive decline, and dysfunction of the autonomic nervous system. FXTAS is found in Fragile X "premutation" carriers, which is defined as a trinucleotide repeat expansion of 55-200 CGG repeats in the Fragile X Messenger Ribonucleoprotein 1 (FMR1) gene. 4-40 CGG repeats in this gene is considered normal, while individual with >200 repeats have full Fragile X Syndrome.

In contrast to FXS full mutation, which is diagnosed early in childhood, symptoms of FXTAS manifest in individuals over the age of 50. Like FXS, FXTAS is most common and most severe in males due to the mutation's X-linked inheritance pattern. FXTAS has an incidence of 30-40% (male) and 8-15% (female) among FXS premutation carriers over the age of 50.

FMR1 mRNA is found to be elevated in patients with FXTAS in contrast to FXS, where the FMR1 gene is transcriptionally silenced via DNA methylation. In both diseases the FMR1 gene product, Fragile X Messenger Ribonucleoprotein (FMRP) is diminished, but in FXTAS this is believed to be mediated by RNA toxicity, while in FXS, FMRP is absent due to transcriptional silencing.

There is no cure for FXTAS, but several of the symptoms can be managed with medication.

== Symptoms and signs ==
The physical symptoms of FXTAS include an intention tremor, cerebellar ataxia, and parkinsonism. This includes small, shuffling steps, muscle rigidity and slowed speech, as well as neuropathic symptoms. As the disease progresses to the more advanced stages, an individual with FXTAS is also at risk of autonomic dysfunction: hypertension, bowel and bladder dysfunction, and impotence.

An individual with FXTAS may also exhibit the following symptoms: a decrease in cognition, which includes diminishing short-term memory and executive function skills, declining math and spelling abilities and decision-making abilities. FXTAS may also result in changes in personality, due to alterations of the limbic area in the brain. This includes increased irritability, angry outbursts, and impulsive behaviour

== Diagnosis ==
FXTAS can be diagnosed using a combination of molecular, clinical, and radiological findings. In order for individuals to develop FXTAS, they must first be premutation carriers, having between 55 and 200 CGG trinucleotide repeat expansion of the FMR1 gene. A definite, probable, or possible diagnosis of FXTAS can be assigned based on combined clinical or radiological findings in conjunction with the molecular premutation.

Clinical findings are divided into major and minor symptoms. Major symptoms include intention tremor and gait ataxia. Minor symptoms such as parkinsonism, short-term memory deficit, and executive function decline can further contribute to a diagnosis of FXTAS. Radiological findings are similarly divided into major and minor categories. As patients with FXTAS can have distinct brain scans from other movement disorders, a scan showing white matter lesions of the middle cerebellar peduncle is a major finding that can be attributed to FXTAS. Overall or generalized brain tissue atrophy and cerebral white matter lesions can also be minor indicators for a diagnosis.

For a definite diagnosis to be made, a major radiological finding and one major clinical finding must be present. Probable diagnosis is based on the presence of either a major radiological finding and a minor clinical finding, or two major clinical findings alone. The possible category for diagnosis can be made with a minor radiological finding and a major clinical finding.

== Management ==
The medical management of FXTAS aims to reduce the level of disability and minimize symptoms. Currently, there are many gaps in the research on the management of FXTAS. The disorder was first described in the literature in 2001. There is no treatment modality aimed at reversing the pathology of FXTAS. However, there are a variety of drug therapies that are being utilized in the management of FXTAS symptoms. There is a lack of randomized control trials assessing the efficacy these therapies, and support is limited to anecdotal evidence. Therefore, many of the treatments are based on what has been helpful in disorders with similar clinical presentations.

There is no cure for FXTAS. Current treatment includes medications for alleviating symptoms of tremor, ataxia, mood changes, anxiety, cognitive decline, dementia, neuropathic pain, or fibromyalgia. Neurological rehabilitation has not been studied for patients with FXTAS but should also be considered as a possible form of therapy. Additionally, occupational and physical therapy may help to improve function. .

== Prognosis ==
The progression of symptoms varies widely between each case of FXTAS; the onset of symptoms may be gradual, with progression of the disease spanning multiple years or decades. Alternatively, symptoms may progress rapidly.

FXTAS has shown strong age-dependent penetrance, affecting older premutation carriers with greater prevalence. Male carriers, age 50 and above have a 30% chance of developing FXTAS, while male carriers, age 75 and above, have a 75% chance of developing the disorder. While initially described as affecting male carriers, female carriers of the FMR1 gene mutation have also been found to develop FXTAS. However, due to X-inactivation, female carriers are much less likely to develop dementia or classic ataxia and tremor, instead demonstrating symptoms such as fibromyalgia, thyroid disease, hypertension, and seizures.

== See also ==
- Fragile X syndrome
- Fragile X-associated Primary Ovarian Insufficiency
