= FXR1 =

Protein-coding gene in the species Homo sapiens

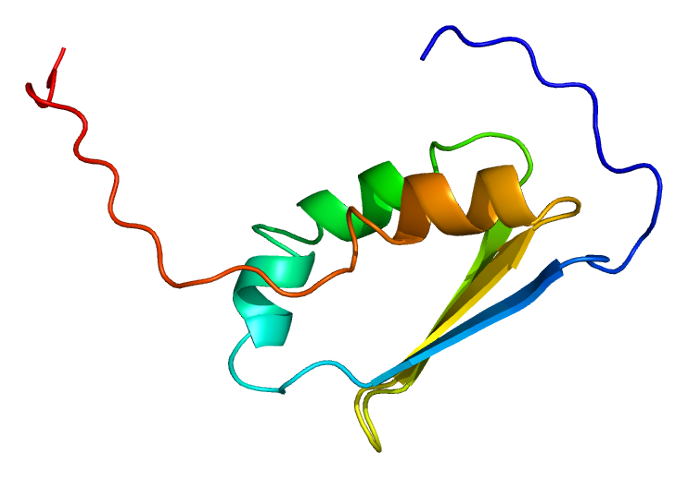
Available structures
PDB	Ortholog search: PDBe RCSB
PDB	List of PDB id codes 2CPQ, 3KUF, 3O8V

Identifiers
- Aliases: FXR1, FXR1P, FMR1 autosomal homolog 1, MYORIBF, MYOPMIL
- External IDs: OMIM: 600819; MGI: 104860; HomoloGene: 3573; GeneCards: FXR1; OMA:FXR1 - orthologs

Gene location (Human)
Chr.	Chromosome 3 (human)
Band	3q26.33	Start	180,868,141 bp
Band	3q26.33	End	180,982,753 bp

Gene location (Mouse)
Chr.	Chromosome 3 (mouse)
Band	3|3 A3	Start	34,074,092 bp
Band	3|3 A3	End	34,124,471 bp
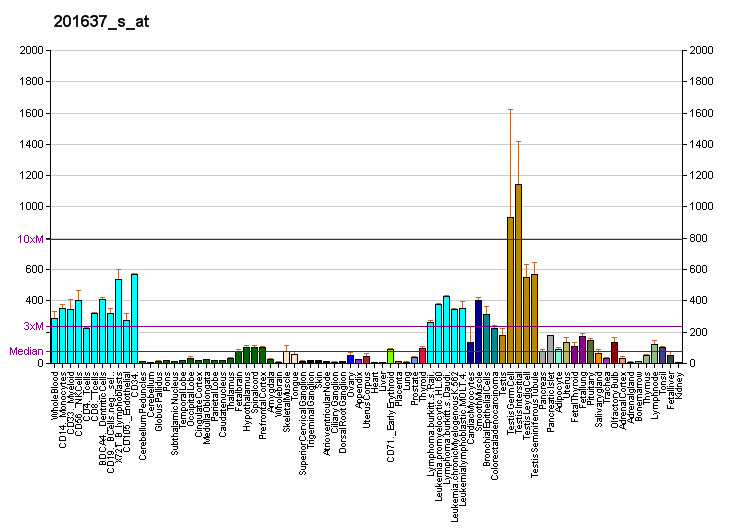

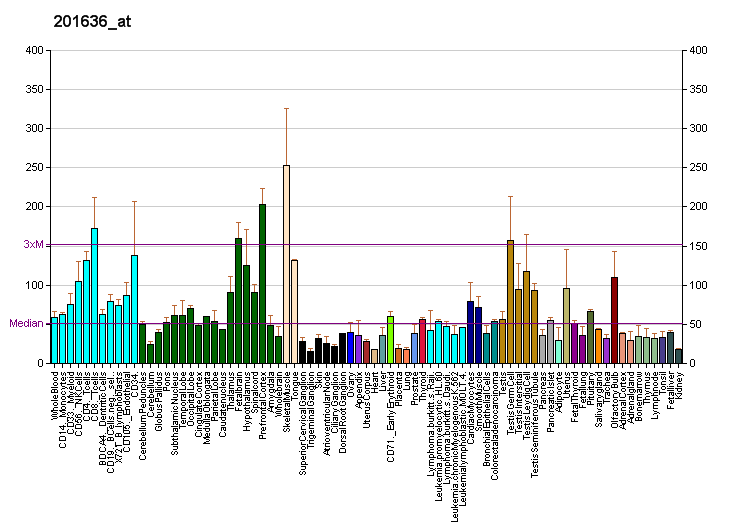

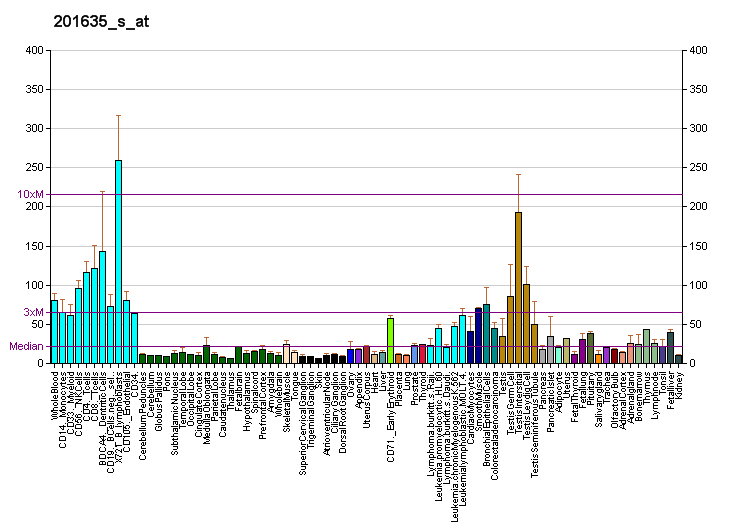
RNA expression pattern
Bgee	Human / Mouse (ortholog); Top expressed in: sperm; muscle of thigh; gastrocnemius muscle; Skeletal muscle tissue of biceps brachii; Skeletal muscle tissue of rectus abdominis; triceps brachii muscle; glutes; ventricular zone; left testis; right testis / Top expressed in: seminiferous tubule; spermatid; temporal muscle; muscle of thigh; ankle; spermatocyte; sternocleidomastoid muscle; tail of embryo; triceps brachii muscle; digastric muscle; More reference expression data
BioGPS	More reference expression data
Gene ontology
Molecular function	protein homodimerization activity; G-quadruplex RNA binding; mRNA 3'-UTR binding; protein binding; protein heterodimerization activity; nucleic acid binding; mRNA binding; RNA strand annealing activity; RNA binding; translation regulator activity
Cellular component	membrane; ribonucleoprotein granule; dendritic spine; axon; dendrite; nucleolus; perinuclear region of cytoplasm; costamere; nucleus; cytosol; cytoplasm; polysome; postsynaptic density; cytoplasmic ribonucleoprotein granule; soma; postsynapse; glutamatergic synapse
Biological process	cell differentiation; muscle organ development; multicellular organism development; apoptotic process; positive regulation of gene silencing by miRNA; negative regulation of translation; regulation of translation; regulation of mRNA stability; positive regulation of translation
Sources:Amigo / QuickGO
Orthologs
Species	Human	Mouse
Entrez	8087	14359
Ensembl	ENSG00000114416	ENSMUSG00000027680
UniProt	P51114	Q61584
RefSeq (mRNA)	NM_001013438; NM_001013439; NM_005087; NM_001363882	NM_001113188; NM_001113189; NM_008053
RefSeq (protein)	NP_001013456; NP_001013457; NP_005078; NP_001350811	NP_001106659; NP_001106660; NP_032079
Location (UCSC)	Chr 3: 180.87 – 180.98 Mb	Chr 3: 34.07 – 34.12 Mb
PubMed search
- Wikidata
View/Edit Human	View/Edit Mouse

Fragile X mental retardation syndrome-related protein 1 is a protein that in humans is encoded by the FXR1 gene.

The protein encoded by this gene is an RNA binding protein that interacts with the functionally similar proteins FMR1 and FXR2. These proteins shuttle between the nucleus and cytoplasm and associate with polyribosomes, predominantly with the 60S ribosomal subunit. Three transcript variants encoding different isoforms have been found for this gene.

== Interactions ==
FXR1 has been shown to interact with FXR2, FMR1 and CYFIP2.
