= FXR2 =

Protein-coding gene in the species Homo sapiens

Available structures
PDB	Ortholog search: PDBe RCSB
PDB	List of PDB id codes 3H8Z

Identifiers
- Aliases: FXR2, FMR1L2, FXR2P, FMR1 autosomal homolog 2
- External IDs: OMIM: 605339; MGI: 1346074; HomoloGene: 21014; GeneCards: FXR2; OMA:FXR2 - orthologs

Gene location (Human)
Chr.	Chromosome 17 (human)
Band	17p13.1	Start	7,591,230 bp
Band	17p13.1	End	7,614,897 bp

Gene location (Mouse)
Chr.	Chromosome 11 (mouse)
Band	11 B3|11 42.86 cM	Start	69,523,816 bp
Band	11 B3|11 42.86 cM	End	69,544,123 bp
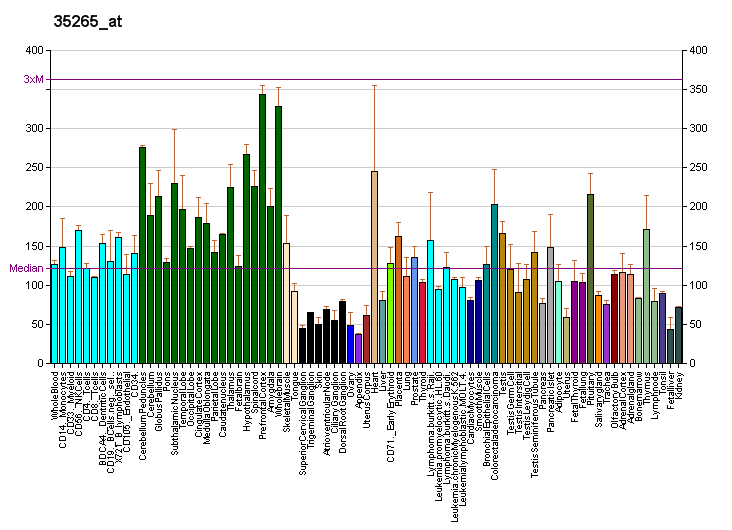

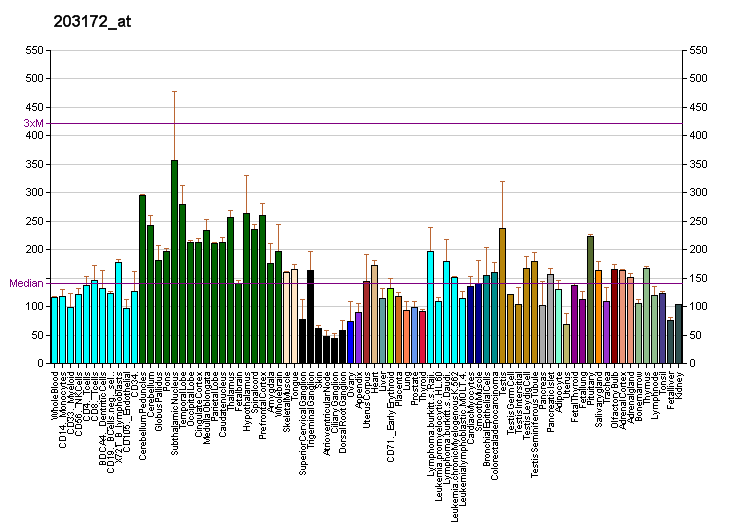
RNA expression pattern
Bgee	Human / Mouse (ortholog); Top expressed in: apex of heart; gastrocnemius muscle; muscle of thigh; superior vestibular nucleus; left ventricle; pons; right hemisphere of cerebellum; inferior ganglion of vagus nerve; right auricle of heart; ventral tegmental area / Top expressed in: neural layer of retina; dentate gyrus of hippocampal formation granule cell; muscle of thigh; superior frontal gyrus; primary visual cortex; ventricular zone; cerebellar cortex; epiblast; spermatocyte; lip; More reference expression data
BioGPS	More reference expression data
Gene ontology
Molecular function	protein heterodimerization activity; nucleic acid binding; protein binding; mRNA binding; protein homodimerization activity; identical protein binding; RNA binding; mRNA 3'-UTR binding; translation regulator activity
Cellular component	polysome; cytosolic large ribosomal subunit; extracellular exosome; membrane; nucleus; cytoplasm; cytosol; postsynaptic density; axon; ribonucleoprotein granule; cytoplasmic ribonucleoprotein granule; soma; dendritic spine
Biological process	negative regulation of translation; regulation of translation; regulation of mRNA stability; positive regulation of translation
Sources:Amigo / QuickGO
Orthologs
Species	Human	Mouse
Entrez	9513	23879
Ensembl	ENSG00000129245	ENSMUSG00000018765
UniProt	P51116	Q9WVR4; Q6P5B5
RefSeq (mRNA)	NM_004860	NM_011814
RefSeq (protein)	NP_004851	NP_035944
Location (UCSC)	Chr 17: 7.59 – 7.61 Mb	Chr 11: 69.52 – 69.54 Mb
PubMed search
- Wikidata
View/Edit Human	View/Edit Mouse

Fragile X mental retardation syndrome-related protein 2 is a protein that in humans is encoded by the FXR2 gene.

== Function ==
The protein encoded by this gene is an RNA-binding protein containing two KH domains and one RCG box, similar to FMRP and FXR1. It associates with polyribosomes, predominantly with 60S large ribosomal subunits. This protein may self-associate or interact with FMRP and FXR1. It may play a role in the development of fragile X intellectual disability syndrome.

== Interactions ==
FXR2 has been shown to interact with:

- CYFIP2,
- FMR1,
- FXR1, and
- LCMT1.
