= CYFIP2 =

Protein-coding gene in the species Homo sapiens

Identifiers
- Aliases: CYFIP2, PIR121, cytoplasmic FMR1 interacting protein 2, EIEE65, DEE65
- External IDs: OMIM: 606323; MGI: 1924134; GeneCards: CYFIP2

Gene location (Human)
Chr.	Chromosome 5 (human)
Band	5q33.3	Start	157,266,079 bp
Band	5q33.3	End	157,395,595 bp

Gene location (Mouse)
Chr.	Chromosome 11 (mouse)
Band	11|11 B1.1	Start	46,084,677 bp
Band	11|11 B1.1	End	46,203,686 bp
RNA expression pattern
Bgee	Human / Mouse (ortholog); Top expressed in: renal medulla; middle temporal gyrus; saphenous vein; lateral nuclear group of thalamus; Region I of hippocampus proper; Brodmann area 23; entorhinal cortex; primary visual cortex; superior frontal gyrus; parietal lobe / Top expressed in: subiculum; olfactory tubercle; primary motor cortex; cerebellar vermis; lobe of cerebellum; superior colliculus; medial dorsal nucleus; dorsal tegmental nucleus; pontine nuclei; primary visual cortex; More reference expression data
BioGPS	n/a
Gene ontology
Molecular function	protein binding; RNA 7-methylguanosine cap binding
Cellular component	cytoplasm; perinuclear region of cytoplasm; neuron projection; cytosol; cell junction; synapse; extracellular exosome; membrane; nucleus; SCAR complex
Biological process	vascular endothelial growth factor receptor signaling pathway; activation of cysteine-type endopeptidase activity; cell adhesion; Fc-gamma receptor signaling pathway involved in phagocytosis; positive regulation of proteolysis; apoptotic process; neuron projection development; positive regulation of neurotrophin TRK receptor signaling pathway; dendrite extension; cell-cell adhesion; cell morphogenesis; axon guidance; cell projection assembly
Sources:Amigo / QuickGO
Orthologs
Databases	NCBI: entry; OMA: entry
Species	Human	Mouse
Entrez	26999	76884
Ensembl	ENSG00000055163	ENSMUSG00000020340
UniProt	Q96F07	Q5SQX6
RefSeq (mRNA)	NM_001037332; NM_001037333; NM_001291721; NM_001291722; NM_014376	NM_001252459; NM_001252460; NM_133769
RefSeq (protein)	NP_001032410; NP_001278650; NP_001278651; NP_055191	NP_001239388; NP_001239389; NP_598530
Location (UCSC)	Chr 5: 157.27 – 157.4 Mb	Chr 11: 46.08 – 46.2 Mb
PubMed search
- Wikidata
View/Edit Human	View/Edit Mouse

Cytoplasmic FMR1-interacting protein 2 is a protein that in humans is encoded by the CYFIP2 gene. Cytoplasmic FMR1 interacting protein is a 1253 amino acid long protein and is highly conserved sharing 99% sequence identity to the mouse protein. It is expressed mainly in brain tissues, white blood cells and the kidney.

== Interactions ==
CYFIP2 has been shown to interact with FMR1. CYFIP2 is a p-53 inducible protein and also interacts with the Fragile=X mental retardation protein.

== RNA editing ==
The pre-mRNA of this protein is subject to RNA editing. The editing site was previously recorded as a single nucleotide polymorphism (rs3207362) in the dbSNP.

=== Type ===
A to I RNA editing is catalyzed by a family of adenosine deaminases acting on RNA (ADARs) that specifically recognize adenosines within double-stranded regions of pre-mRNAs and deaminate them to inosine. Inosines are recognised as guanosine by the cells translational machinery. There are three members of the ADAR family ADARs 1-3 with ADAR1 and ADAR2 being the only enzymatically active members. ADAR3 is thought to have a regulatory role in the brain. ADAR1 and ADAR 2 are widely expressed in tissues while ADAR3 is restricted to the brain. The double stranded regions of RNA are formed by base-pairing between residues in the close to region of the editing site with residues usually in a neighboring intron but can be an exonic sequence. The region that base pairs with the editing region is known as an Editing Complementary Sequence (ECS).

=== Site ===
An editing site was found in the pre-mRNA of this protein. The substitution occurs within amino acid position 320 in humans and also in mice. A possible double stranded RNA region has not been detected for this pre-mRNA. No double stranded region required by ADARs has predicted. Immunoprecipitation experiments and RNA interference have shown that ADAR 2 is likely to be the main editing enzyme for this site with ADAR 1 having a minor role.

=== Regulation ===
Editing seems to be differentially regulated in different tissues. The highest level of editing occurs in the cerebellum with lower frequency of editing detected in human lung, prostrate and uterus tissues. Editing frequency varies from 30-85% depending on tissue.{ There is some evidence for a decrease in CYFIP2 editing with increased age.

==== Conservation ====
Editing of the pre-mRNA of this gene has been detected in mouse and chicken.

=== Effects of RNA editing ===
==== Structural ====
Editing results in a codon change resulting in a glutamic acid being translated instead of a lysine.

==== Functional ====
Currently unknown but editing may have role in regulation of apoptotic functions of this protein. It is thought that since the protein is p53 inducible that the protein may be pro-apopototic. Also ADAR1 knock out mice show increase in apoptosis which indicates editing may be involved in regulation of the cellular process.
