= FMR1 =

Human protein and coding gene

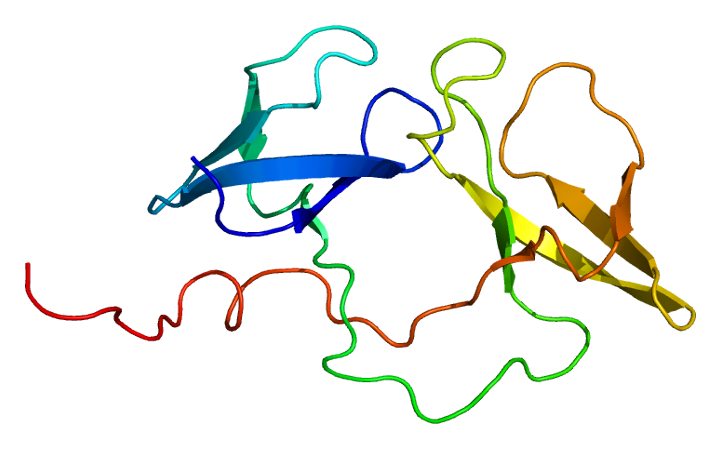

Identifiers
- Aliases: FMR1, FMRP, FRAXA, POF, POF1, fragile X mental retardation 1, FMRP translational regulator 1, fragile X messenger ribonucleoprotein 1
- External IDs: OMIM: 309550; MGI: 95564; GeneCards: FMR1
Available structures
PDB	Ortholog search: PDBe RCSB
PDB	List of PDB id codes 2BKD, 2FMR, 2LA5, 2QND, 4OVA, 4QVZ, 4QW2, 5DE5, 5DE8, 5DEA

Gene location (Human)
Chr.	X chromosome (human)
Band	Xq27.3	Start	147,911,919 bp
Band	Xq27.3	End	147,951,125 bp

Gene location (Mouse)
Chr.	X chromosome (mouse)
Band	X A7.1|X 34.83 cM	Start	67,722,147 bp
Band	X A7.1|X 34.83 cM	End	67,761,569 bp
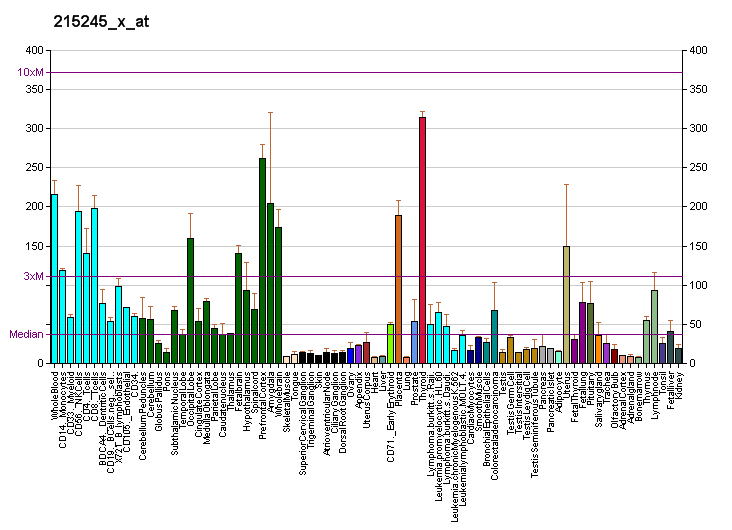

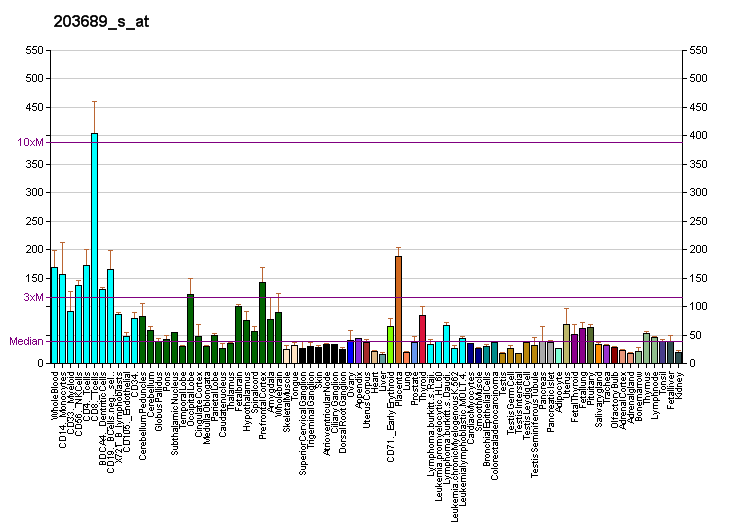
RNA expression pattern
Bgee	Human / Mouse (ortholog); Top expressed in: caput epididymis; corpus epididymis; sural nerve; endothelial cell; Epithelium of choroid plexus; tail of epididymis; mucosa of paranasal sinus; epithelium of colon; retinal pigment epithelium; Achilles tendon / Top expressed in: Gonadal ridge; cumulus cell; white adipose tissue; vas deferens; abdominal wall; migratory enteric neural crest cell; left lung lobe; pineal gland; ventricular zone; mandibular prominence; More reference expression data
BioGPS	More reference expression data
Gene ontology
Molecular function	protein homodimerization activity; poly(U) RNA binding; ribosome binding; poly(G) binding; protein binding; protein heterodimerization activity; nucleic acid binding; translation initiation factor binding; mRNA binding; G-quadruplex RNA binding; RNA strand annealing activity; siRNA binding; miRNA binding; mRNA 3'-UTR binding; mRNA 5'-UTR binding; translation repressor activity; microtubule binding; chromatin binding; methylated histone binding; sequence-specific mRNA binding; transmembrane transporter binding; RNA stem-loop binding; dynein complex binding; RNA binding; identical protein binding; translation regulator activity
Cellular component	cytoplasm; axon terminus; dendritic spine; nucleoplasm; SMN complex; mRNA cap binding complex; dendrite; nucleolus; neuron projection; cytoplasmic ribonucleoprotein granule; nucleus; polysomal ribosome; perikaryon; perinuclear region of cytoplasm; ribonucleoprotein complex; postsynaptic density; chromocenter; axon; cell junction; neuronal ribonucleoprotein granule; filopodium tip; postsynaptic membrane; polysome; Cajal body; chromosome; growth cone; chromosome, centromeric region; growth cone filopodium; viral replication complex; plasma membrane; extrinsic component of plasma membrane; glial cell projection; cell projection; membrane; dendritic filopodium; presynaptic membrane; presynapse; postsynapse; synapse; cytosol; messenger ribonucleoprotein complex; cytoplasmic stress granule; ribonucleoprotein granule; soma; dendritic spine neck; axon cytoplasm
Biological process	negative regulation of translational initiation; regulation of dendritic spine development; positive regulation of intracellular transport of viral material; cellular response to virus; RNA splicing; regulation of gene silencing by miRNA; cellular response to hydroxyurea; regulation of neurotransmitter secretion; positive regulation of gene silencing by miRNA; nervous system development; cellular response to DNA damage stimulus; gene silencing; mRNA processing; mRNA transport; positive regulation of proteasomal protein catabolic process; viral process; regulation of mRNA stability; positive regulation of response to DNA damage stimulus; positive regulation of dendritic spine development; regulation of filopodium assembly; negative regulation of cytoplasmic translation; regulation of translation; regulation of alternative mRNA splicing, via spliceosome; regulation of neuronal action potential; positive regulation of mRNA binding; cellular response to UV; modulation by host of viral RNA genome replication; glutamate receptor signaling pathway; negative regulation of long-term synaptic depression; positive regulation of filopodium assembly; negative regulation of synaptic vesicle exocytosis; positive regulation of receptor internalization; negative regulation of voltage-gated calcium channel activity; positive regulation of translation; negative regulation of mRNA catabolic process; transport; positive regulation of protein phosphorylation; central nervous system development; anterograde axonal transport; negative regulation of translation; regulation of dendrite morphogenesis; regulation of translation at postsynapse, modulating synaptic transmission; regulation of modification of synaptic structure
Sources:Amigo / QuickGO
Orthologs
Databases	NCBI: entry; OMA: entry
Species	Human	Mouse
Entrez	2332	14265
Ensembl	ENSG00000102081	ENSMUSG00000000838
UniProt	Q06787	P35922
RefSeq (mRNA)	NM_001185075; NM_001185076; NM_001185081; NM_001185082; NM_002024	NM_001290424; NM_008031; NM_001374719
RefSeq (protein)	NP_001172004; NP_001172005; NP_001172010; NP_001172011; NP_002015	n/a
Location (UCSC)	Chr X: 147.91 – 147.95 Mb	Chr X: 67.72 – 67.76 Mb
PubMed search
- Wikidata
View/Edit Human	View/Edit Mouse

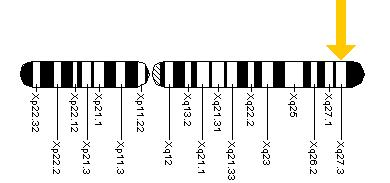
Location of FMR1 on the X chromosome.

FMR1 (Fragile X Messenger Ribonucleoprotein 1) is a human gene that codes for the protein fragile X messenger ribonucleoprotein (FMRP). This protein, most commonly found in the brain, is essential for normal cognitive development and female reproductive function. Mutations of this gene can lead to fragile X syndrome, intellectual disability, FXPOI (Fragile X-associated primary ovarian insufficiency), autism, FXTAS (Fragile X-associated tremor/ataxia syndrome), developmental delays and other cognitive deficits. The FMR1 premutation is associated with a wide spectrum of clinical phenotypes that affect more than two million people worldwide.

== Function ==
=== Synaptic plasticity ===
FMRP has a diverse array of functions throughout different areas of the neuron; however these functions have not been fully characterized. FMRP has been suggested to play roles in nucleocytoplasmic shuttling of mRNA, dendritic mRNA localization, and synaptic protein synthesis. Studies of Fragile X syndrome have significantly aided in the understanding of the functionality of FMRP through the observed effects of FMRP loss on neurons. A mouse model of Fragile X Messenger Ribonucleoprotein implicated the involvement of FMRP in synaptic plasticity. Synaptic plasticity requires the production of new proteins in response to activation of synaptic receptors. It is the production of proteins in response to stimulation which is hypothesized to allow for the permanent physical changes and altered synaptic connections that are linked with the processes of learning and memory.

Group 1 metabotropic glutamate receptor (mGluR) signaling has been implicated in playing an important role in FMRP-dependent synaptic plasticity. Post-synaptic mGluR stimulation results in the up-regulation of protein synthesis through a second messenger system. A role for mGluR in synaptic plasticity is further evidenced by the observation of dendritic spine elongation following mGluR stimulation. Furthermore, mGluR activation results in the synthesis of FMRP near synapses. The produced FMRP associates with polyribosomal complexes after mGluR stimulation, proposing the involvement of Fragile X Messenger Ribonucleoprotein in the process of translation. This further advocates a role for FMRP in synaptic protein synthesis and the growth of synaptic connections. The loss of FMRP results in an abnormal dendritic spine phenotype. Specifically, deletion of the FMR1 gene in a sample of mice resulted in an increase in spine synapse number.

=== Role in translation ===
The proposed mechanism of FMRP's effect upon synaptic plasticity are through its role as a negative regulator of translation. FMRP is an RNA-binding protein which associates with polyribosomes. The RNA-binding abilities of FMRP are dependent upon its KH domains and RGG boxes. The KH domain is a conserved motif which characterizes many RNA-binding proteins. Mutagenesis of this domain resulted in impaired FMRP binding to RNA.

FMRP has been shown to inhibit translation of mRNA. Mutation of the FMRP protein resulted in the inability to repress translation as opposed to the wild-type counterpart which was able to do so in model systems (reticulocyte lysates and Xenopus laevis oocytes). These observations were extended to the mouse brain, where crosslinking immunoprecipitation (CLIP) studies showed that FMRP binds to mRNA targets to stall ribosomes and inhibit translation, and does so in a reversible manner. In purified synaptoneurosomes, mGluR stimulation results in increased levels of FMRP target mRNAs. A study found basal levels of proteins encoded by these target mRNAs to be significantly elevated and improperly regulated in FMRP deficient mice.

FMRP translation repression can act by inhibiting the initiation of translation. FMRP directly binds CYFIP1, which in turn binds the translation initiation factor eIF4E. The FMRP-CYFIP1 complex prohibits eIF4E-dependent initiation, thereby acting to repress translation. When applied to the observed phenotype in fragile X Syndrome, the excess protein levels and reduction of translational control can be explained by the loss of translational repression by FMRP in fragile X syndrome. FMRP acts to control translation of a large group of target mRNAs; however the extent of FMRPs translational control is unknown. The protein has been shown to repress the translation of target mRNAs at synapses, including those encoding the cytoskeletal proteins Arc/Arg3.1 and MAP1B, and the CaM kinase II. In addition, FMRP binds PSD-95 and GluR1/2 mRNAs. Importantly, these FMRP-binding mRNAs play significant roles in neuronal plasticity.

FMRP translational control has been shown to be regulated by mGluR signaling. mGluR stimulation may result in the transportation of mRNA complexes to synapses for local protein synthesis. FMRP granules have been shown to localize with MAP1B mRNA and ribosomal RNA in dendrites, suggesting this complex as a whole may need to be transported to dendrites for local protein synthesis. In addition, microtubules were found to be a necessary component for the mGluR-dependent translocation of FMRP into dendrites. FMRP may play an additional role in local protein synthesis by aiding in the association of mRNA cargo and microtubules. Thus, FMRP is able to regulate transport efficacy, as well as repression of translation during transport. Finally, FMRP synthesis, ubiquitination, and proteolysis occur rapidly in response to mGluR signaling, suggesting an extremely dynamic role of the translational regulator.

== Gene expression ==
The FMR1 gene is located on the X chromosome and contains a repeated CGG trinucleotide. In most people, the CGG segment is repeated approximately 5-44 times. Higher numbers of repeats of the CGG segment are associated with impaired cognitive and reproductive function. If a person has 45-54 repeats this is considered the "gray zone" or borderline risk, 55-200 repeats is called premutation, and more than 200 repeats is considered a full mutation of the FMR1 gene according to the American College of Medical Genetics and Genomics. The first complete DNA sequence of the repeat expansion in someone with the full mutation was generated by scientists in 2012 using SMRT sequencing. This is an example of a trinucleotide repeat disorder. Trinucleotide repeat expansion is likely a consequence of strand slippage either during DNA repair or DNA replication.

FMRP is a chromatin-binding protein that functions in the DNA damage response. FMRP occupies sites on meiotic chromosomes and regulates the dynamics of the DNA damage response machinery during spermatogenesis.

The FMR1 gene can be found on the long (q) arm of the X chromosome at position 27.3, from base pair 146,699,054 to base pair 146,738,156

== Related conditions ==
=== Fragile X syndrome ===
Almost all cases of fragile X syndrome are caused by expansion of the CGG trinucleotide repeat in the FMR1 gene. In these cases, CGG is abnormally repeated from 200 to more than 1,000 times. As a result, this part of the FMR1 gene is methylated, which silences the gene (it is turned off and does not make any protein). Without adequate FMR1, severe learning disabilities or intellectual disabilities can develop, along with physical abnormalities seen in fragile X syndrome.

Fewer than 1% of all cases of fragile X syndrome are caused by mutations that delete part or all of the FMR1 gene, or change a base pair, leading to a change in one of the amino acids in the gene. These mutations disrupt the 3-dimensional shape of FMRP or prevent the protein from being synthesized, leading to the signs and symptoms of fragile X syndrome.

A CGG sequence in the FMR1 gene that is repeated between 55 and 200 times is described as a premutation. Although most individuals with the premutation are intellectually normal, some of these individuals have mild versions of the physical features seen in fragile X syndrome (such as prominent ears) and may experience mental health problems such as anxiety or depression.

=== Fragile X-associated tremor/ataxia syndrome ===
Premutations are associated with an increased risk of fragile X-associated tremor/ataxia syndrome (FXTAS). FXTAS is characterized by ataxia (loss of coordination), tremor, memory loss, loss of sensation in the lower extremities (peripheral neuropathy) and mental and behavioral changes. The disorder usually develops late in life.

=== Premature ovarian aging ===
The FMR1 gene plays a very important role in ovarian function, independent from cognitive/neurological effects. Minor expansions of CGG repeats that do not cause fragile X syndrome are associated with an increased risk for premature ovarian aging, also called occult primary ovarian insufficiency, a condition in which women prematurely deplete their ovarian function.

=== Polyendocrine metabolic ovarian syndrome (PMOS) ===
A very specific sub-genotype of FMR1 has been found to be associated with polyendocrine metabolic ovarian syndrome (PMOS). The gene expression, called heterozygous-normal/low may cause PMOS-like excessive follicle activity and hyperactive ovarian function when women are younger.

== Interactions ==
FMR1 has been shown to interact with:

- CYFIP1,
- CYFIP2,
- FXR1, and
- FXR2,
- NUFIP1, and
- NUFIP2.
