= DNA damage (naturally occurring) =

Damage in DNA which occurs naturally

Natural DNA damage is an alteration in the chemical structure of DNA, such as a break in a strand of DNA, a nucleobase missing from the backbone of DNA, or a chemically changed base such as 8-OHdG. DNA damage can occur naturally or via environmental factors, but is distinctly different from mutation, although both are types of error in DNA. DNA damage is an abnormal chemical structure in DNA, while a mutation is a change in the sequence of base pairs. DNA damages cause changes in the structure of the genetic material and prevents the replication mechanism from functioning and performing properly. The DNA damage response (DDR) is a complex signal transduction pathway which recognizes when DNA is damaged and initiates the cellular response to the damage.

DNA damage and mutation have different biological consequences. While most DNA damages can undergo DNA repair, such repair is not 100% efficient. Un-repaired DNA damages accumulate in non-replicating cells, such as cells in the brains or muscles of adult mammals, and can cause aging. (Also see DNA damage theory of aging.) In replicating cells, such as cells lining the colon, errors occur upon replication of past damages in the template strand of DNA or during repair of DNA damages. These errors can give rise to mutations or epigenetic alterations. Both of these types of alteration can be replicated and passed on to subsequent cell generations. These alterations can change gene function or regulation of gene expression and possibly contribute to progression to cancer.

Throughout the cell cycle there are various checkpoints to ensure the cell is in good condition to progress to mitosis. The three main checkpoints are at G1/s, G2/m, and at the spindle assembly checkpoint regulating progression through anaphase. G1 and G2 checkpoints involve scanning for damaged DNA. During S phase the cell is more vulnerable to DNA damage than any other part of the cell cycle. G2 checkpoint checks for damaged DNA and DNA replication completeness.

== Types ==
Damage to DNA that occurs naturally can result from metabolic or hydrolytic processes. Metabolism releases compounds that damage DNA including reactive oxygen species, reactive nitrogen species, reactive carbonyl species, lipid peroxidation products, and alkylating agents, among others, while hydrolysis cleaves chemical bonds in DNA. Naturally occurring oxidative DNA damages arise at least 10,000 times per cell per day in humans and as much as 100,000 per cell per day in rats as documented below.

Oxidative DNA damage can produce more than 20 types of altered bases as well as single strand breaks.

Other types of endogenous DNA damages, given below with their frequencies of occurrence, include depurinations, depyrimidinations, double-strand breaks, O6-methylguanines, and cytosine deamination.

DNA can be damaged via environmental factors as well. Environmental agents such as UV light, ionizing radiation, and genotoxic chemicals. Replication forks can be stalled due to damaged DNA and double strand breaks are also a form of DNA damage.

=== Frequencies ===
The list below shows some frequencies with which new naturally occurring DNA damages arise per day, due to endogenous cellular processes.

- Oxidative damages
  - Humans, per cell per day:
    - 10,000
    - 11,500
    - 2,800 specific damages 8-oxoGua, 8-oxodG plus 5-HMUra
  - Rats, per cell per day:
    - 74,000
    - 86,000
    - 100,000
  - Mice, per cell per day:
    - 34,000 specific damages 8-oxoGua, 8-oxodG plus 5-HMUra
    - 47,000 specific damages oxo8dG in mouse liver
    - 28,000 specific damages 8-oxoGua, 8-oxodG, 5-HMUra
- Depurinations
  - Mammalian cells, per cell per day:
    - 2,000 to 10,000
    - 9,000
    - 12,000
    - 13,920
- Depyrimidinations
  - Mammalian cells, per cell per day:
    - 600
    - 696
- Single-strand breaks
  - Mammalian cells, per cell per day:
    - 55,200
- Double-strand breaks
  - Human cells, per cell cycle
    - 10
    - 50
- O6-methylguanines
  - Mammalian cells, per cell per day:
    - 3,120
- Cytosine deamination
  - Mammalian cells, per cell per day:
    - 192

Another important endogenous DNA damage is M1dG, short for (3-(2'-deoxy-beta-D-erythro-pentofuranosyl)-pyrimido[1,2-a]-purin-10(3H)-one). The excretion in urine (likely reflecting rate of occurrence) of M1dG may be as much as 1,000-fold lower than that of 8-oxodG. However, a more important measure may be the steady-state level in DNA, reflecting both rate of occurrence and rate of DNA repair. The steady-state level of M1dG is higher than that of 8-oxodG. This points out that some DNA damages produced at a low rate may be difficult to repair and remain in DNA at a high steady-state level. Both M1dG and 8-oxodG are mutagenic.

=== Steady-state levels ===
Steady-state levels of DNA damages represent the balance between formation and repair. More than 100 types of oxidative DNA damage have been characterized, and 8-oxodG constitutes about 5% of the steady state oxidative damages in DNA. Helbock et al. estimated that there were 24,000 steady state oxidative DNA adducts per cell in young rats and 66,000 adducts per cell in old rats. This reflects the accumulation of DNA damage with age. DNA damage accumulation with age is further described in DNA damage theory of aging.

Swenberg et al. measured average amounts of selected steady state endogenous DNA damages in mammalian cells. The seven most common damages they evaluated are shown in Table 1.

Table 1. Steady-state amounts of endogenous DNA damages
Endogenous lesions	Number per cell
Abasic sites	30,000
N7-(2-hydroxyethyl)guanine (7HEG)	3,000
8-hydroxyguanine	2,400
7-(2-oxoethyl)guanine	1,500
Formaldehyde adducts	960
Acrolein-deoxyguanine	120
Malondialdehyde-deoxyguanine	60

Evaluating steady-state damages in specific tissues of the rat, Nakamura and Swenberg indicated that the number of abasic sites varied from about 50,000 per cell in liver, kidney and lung to about 200,000 per cell in the brain.

== Biomolecular pathways ==
Proteins promoting endogenous DNA damage were identified in a 2019 paper as the DNA "damage-up" proteins (DDPs). The DDP mechanisms fall into 3 clusters:

- reactive oxygen increase by transmembrane transporters,
- chromosome loss by replisome binding,
- replication stalling by transcription factors.

The DDP human homologs are over-represented in known cancer drivers, and their RNAs in tumors predict heavy mutagenesis and a poor prognosis.

== Repair of damaged DNA ==
In the presence of DNA damage, the cell can either repair the damage or induce cell death if the damage is beyond repair.

=== Types ===
The seven main types of DNA repair and one pathway of damage tolerance, the lesions they address, and the accuracy of the repair (or tolerance) are shown in this table. For a brief description of the steps in repair see DNA repair mechanisms or see each individual pathway.

Major pathways of DNA repair and one tolerance mechanism
Repair pathway	Lesions	Accuracy	Ref.
Base excision repair	corrects DNA damage from oxidation, deamination and alkylation, also single-strand breaks	accurate	
Nucleotide excision repair	oxidative endogenous lesions such as cyclopurine, sunlight-induced thymine dimers (cyclobutane dimers and pyrimidine (6–4) pyrimidone photoproducts)	accurate	
Homology-directed repair	double-strand breaks in the mid-S phase or mid-G2 phase of the cell cycle	accurate	
Non-homologous end joining	double-strand breaks if cells are in the G0 phase, the G1 phase, or the G2 phase of the cell cycle	somewhat inaccurate	
Microhomology-mediated end joining or alt-End joining	double-strand breaks in the S phase of the cell cycle	always inaccurate	
DNA mismatch repair	base substitution mismatches and insertion-deletion mismatches generated during DNA replication	accurate	
Direct reversal (MGMT and AlkB)	6-O-methylguanine is reversed to guanine by MGMT, some other methylated bases are demethylated by AlkB	accurate	
Translesion synthesis	DNA damage tolerance process that allows the DNA replication machinery to replicate past DNA lesions	may be inaccurate	

== Aging and cancer ==
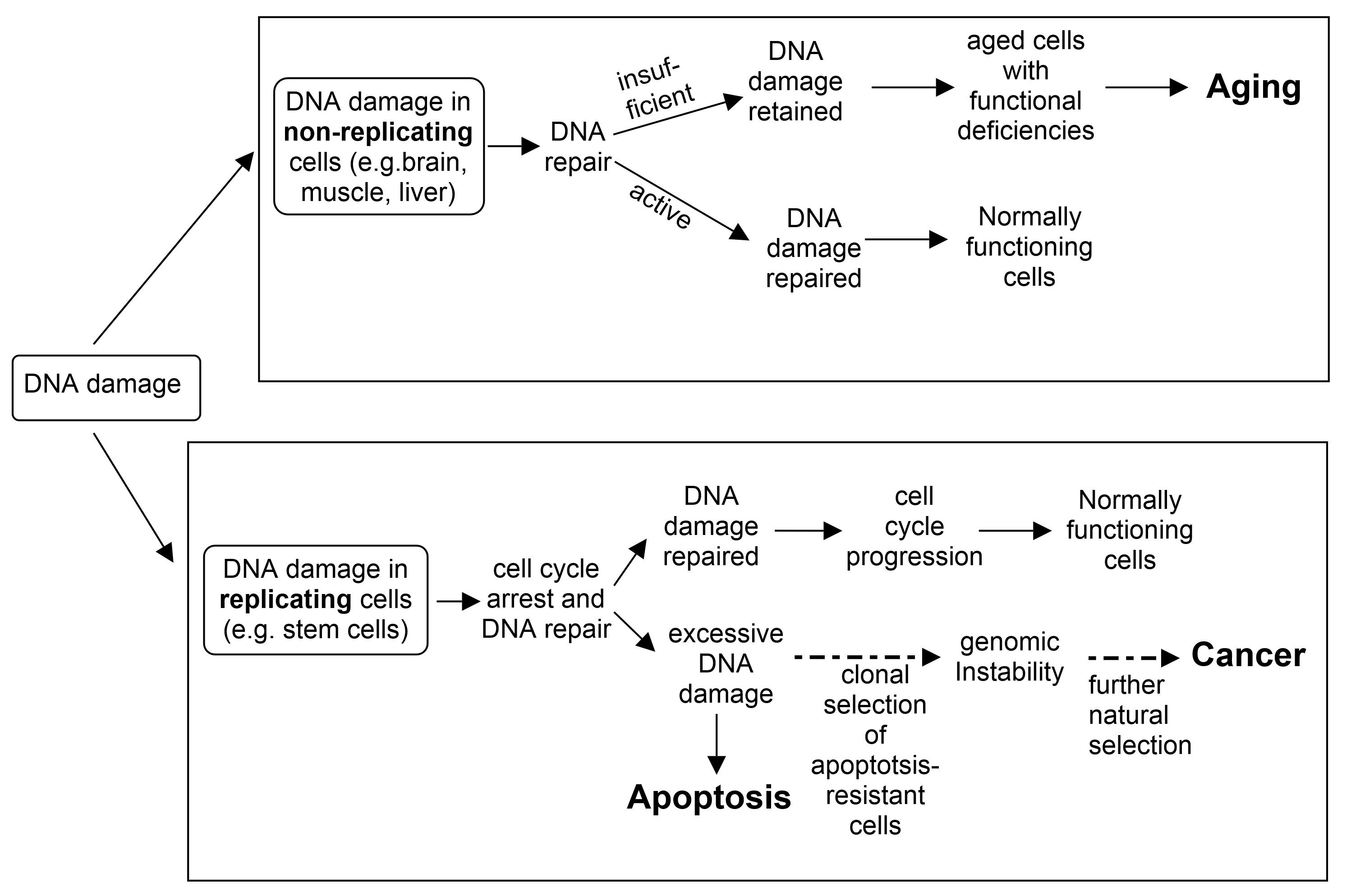
DNA damage in non-replicating cells, if not repaired and accumulated can lead to aging. DNA damage in replicating cells, if not repaired can lead to either apoptosis or to cancer.

The schematic diagram indicates the roles of insufficient DNA repair in aging and cancer, and the role of apoptosis in cancer prevention. An excess of naturally occurring DNA damage, due to inherited deficiencies in particular DNA repair enzymes, can cause premature aging or increased risk for cancer (see DNA repair-deficiency disorder). On the other hand, the ability to trigger apoptosis in the presence of excess un-repaired DNA damage is critical for prevention of cancer.

== Apoptosis and cancer prevention ==
DNA repair proteins are often activated or induced when DNA has sustained damage. However, excessive DNA damage can initiate apoptosis (i.e., programmed cell death) if the level of DNA damage exceeds the repair capacity. Apoptosis can prevent cells with excess DNA damage from undergoing mutagenesis and progression to cancer.

Inflammation is often caused by infection, such as with hepatitis B virus (HBV), hepatitis C virus (HCV) or Helicobacter pylori. Chronic inflammation is also a central characteristic of obesity. Such inflammation causes oxidative DNA damage. This is due to the induction of reactive oxygen species (ROS) by various intracellular inflammatory mediators. HBV and HCV infections, in particular, cause 10,000-fold and 100,000-fold increases in intracellular ROS production, respectively. Inflammation-induced ROS that cause DNA damage can trigger apoptosis, but may also cause cancer if repair and apoptotic processes are insufficiently protective.

Bile acids, stored in the gall bladder, are released into the small intestine in response to fat in the diet. Higher levels of fat cause greater release. Bile acids cause DNA damage, including oxidative DNA damage, double-strand DNA breaks, aneuploidy and chromosome breakage. High-normal levels of the bile acid deoxycholic acid cause apoptosis in human colon cells, but may also lead to colon cancer if repair and apoptotic defenses are insufficient.

Apoptosis serves as a safeguard mechanism against tumorigenesis. It prevents the increased mutagenesis that excess DNA damage could cause, upon replication.

At least 17 DNA repair proteins, distributed among five DNA repair pathways, have a "dual role" in response to DNA damage. With moderate levels of DNA damage, these proteins initiate or contribute to DNA repair. However, when excessive levels of DNA damage are present, they trigger apoptosis.

== DNA damage response ==
The packaging of eukaryotic DNA into chromatin is a barrier to all DNA-based processes that require enzyme action. For most DNA repair processes, the chromatin must be remodeled. In eukaryotes, ATP-dependent chromatin remodeling complexes and histone-modifying enzymes are two factors that act to accomplish this remodeling process after DNA damage occurs. Further DNA repair steps, involving multiple enzymes, usually follow. Some of the first responses to DNA damage, with their timing, are described below. More complete descriptions of the DNA repair pathways are presented in articles describing each pathway. At least 169 enzymes are involved in DNA repair pathways.

=== Base excision repair ===
Oxidized bases in DNA are produced in cells treated with Hoechst dye followed by micro-irradiation with 405 nm light. Such oxidized bases can be repaired by base excision repair.

When the 405 nm light is focused along a narrow line within the nucleus of a cell, about 2.5 seconds after irradiation, the chromatin remodeling enzyme Alc1 achieves half-maximum recruitment onto the irradiated micro-line. The line of chromatin that was irradiated then relaxes, expanding side-to-side over the next 60 seconds.

Within 6 seconds of the irradiation with 405 nm light, there is half-maximum recruitment of OGG1 to the irradiated line. OGG1 is an enzyme that removes the oxidative DNA damage 8-oxo-dG from DNA. Removal of 8-oxo-dG, during base excision repair, occurs with a half-life of 11 minutes.

=== Nucleotide excision repair ===
Ultraviolet (UV) light induces the formation of DNA damages including pyrimidine dimers (such as thymine dimers) and 6,4 photoproducts. These types of "bulky" damages are repaired by nucleotide excision repair.

After irradiation with UV light, DDB2, in a complex with DDB1, the ubiquitin ligase protein CUL4A and the RING finger protein ROC1, associates with sites of damage within chromatin. Half-maximum association occurs in 40 seconds. PARP1 also associates within this period. The PARP1 protein attaches to both DDB1 and DDB2 and then PARylates (creates a poly-ADP ribose chain) on DDB2 that attracts the DNA remodeling protein ALC1. ALC1 relaxes chromatin at sites of UV damage to DNA. In addition, the ubiquitin E3 ligase complex DDB1-CUL4A carries out ubiquitination of the core histones H2A, H3, and H4, as well as the repair protein XPC, which has been attracted to the site of the DNA damage. XPC, upon ubiquitination, is activated and initiates the nucleotide excision repair pathway. Somewhat later, at 30 minutes after UV damage, the INO80 chromatin remodeling complex is recruited to the site of the DNA damage, and this coincides with the binding of further nucleotide excision repair proteins, including ERCC1.

=== Homologous recombinational repair ===
Double-strand breaks (DSBs) at specific sites can be induced by transfecting cells with a plasmid encoding I-SceI endonuclease (a homing endonuclease). Multiple DSBs can be induced by irradiating sensitized cells (labeled with 5'-bromo-2'-deoxyuridine and with Hoechst dye) with 780 nm light. These DSBs can be repaired by the accurate homologous recombinational repair or by the less accurate non-homologous end joining repair pathway. Here we describe the early steps in homologous recombinational repair (HRR).

After treating cells to introduce DSBs, the stress-activated protein kinase, c-Jun N-terminal kinase (JNK), phosphorylates SIRT6 on serine 10. This post-translational modification facilitates the mobilization of SIRT6 to DNA damage sites with half-maximum recruitment in well under a second. SIRT6 at the site is required for efficient recruitment of poly (ADP-ribose) polymerase 1 (PARP1) to a DNA break site and for efficient repair of DSBs. PARP1 protein starts to appear at DSBs in less than a second, with half maximum accumulation within 1.6 seconds after the damage occurs. This then allows half maximum recruitment of the DNA repair enzymes MRE11 within 13 seconds and NBS1 within 28 seconds. MRE11 and NBS1 carry out early steps of the HRR pathway.

γH2AX, the phosphorylated form of H2AX is also involved in early steps of DSB repair. The histone variant H2AX constitutes about 10% of the H2A histones in human chromatin. γH2AX (H2AX phosphorylated on serine 139) can be detected as soon as 20 seconds after irradiation of cells (with DNA double-strand break formation), and half maximum accumulation of γH2AX occurs in one minute. The extent of chromatin with phosphorylated γH2AX is about two million base pairs at the site of a DNA double-strand break. γH2AX does not, itself, cause chromatin decondensation, but within 30 seconds of irradiation, RNF8 protein can be detected in association with γH2AX. RNF8 mediates extensive chromatin decondensation, through its subsequent interaction with CHD4, a component of the nucleosome remodeling and deacetylase complex NuRD.

=== Pause for DNA repair ===
After rapid chromatin remodeling, cell cycle checkpoints may be activated to allow DNA repair to be completed before the cell cycle progresses. First, two kinases, ATM and ATR, are activated within 5 or 6 minutes after DNA is damaged. This is followed by phosphorylation of the cell cycle checkpoint protein Chk1, initiating its function, about 10 minutes after DNA is damaged.

== Role of oxidative damage to guanine in gene regulation ==
The DNA damage 8-oxo-dG does not occur randomly in the genome. In mouse embryonic fibroblasts, a 2 to 5-fold enrichment of 8-oxo-dG was found in genetic control regions, including promoters, 5'-untranslated regions and 3'-untranslated regions compared to 8-oxo-dG levels found in gene bodies and in intergenic regions. In rat pulmonary artery endothelial cells, when 22,414 protein-coding genes were examined for locations of 8-oxo-dG, the majority of 8-oxo-dGs (when present) were found in promoter regions rather than within gene bodies. Among hundreds of genes whose expression levels were affected by hypoxia, those with newly acquired promoter 8-oxo-dGs were upregulated, and those genes whose promoters lost 8-oxo-dGs were almost all downregulated.

As reviewed by Wang et al., oxidized guanine appears to have multiple regulatory roles in gene expression. In particular, when oxidative stress produces 8-oxo-dG in the promoter of a gene, the oxidative stress may also inactivate OGG1, an enzyme that targets 8-oxo-dG and normally initiates repair of 8-oxo-dG damage. The inactive OGG1, which no longer excises 8-oxo-dG, nevertheless targets and complexes with 8-oxo-dG, and causes a sharp (~70^{o}) bend in the DNA. This allows the assembly of a transcriptional initiation complex, up-regulating transcription of the associated gene.

When 8-oxo-dG is formed in a guanine rich, potential G-quadruplex-forming sequence (PQS) in the coding strand of a promoter, active OGG1 excises the 8-oxo-dG and generates an apurinic/apyrimidinic site (AP site or abasic site). The AP site enables melting of the duplex to unmask the PQS, adopting a G-quadruplex fold (G4 structure/motif) that has a regulatory role in transcription activation.

When 8-oxo-dG is complexed with active OGG1 it may then recruit chromatin remodelers to modulate gene expression. Chromodomain helicase DNA-binding protein 4 (CHD4), a component of the (NuRD) complex, is recruited by OGG1 to oxidative DNA damage sites. CHD4 then attracts DNA and histone methylating enzymes that repress transcription of associated genes.

== Role of DNA damage in memory formation ==
=== Oxidation of guanine ===
Oxidation of guanine, particularly within CpG sites, may be especially important in learning and memory. Methylation of cytosines occurs at 60–90% of CpG sites depending on the tissue type. In the mammalian brain, ~62% of CpGs are methylated. Methylation of CpG sites tends to stably silence genes. More than 500 of these CpG sites are de-methylated in neuron DNA during memory formation and memory consolidation in the hippocampus and cingulate cortex regions of the brain. As indicated below, the first step in de-methylation of methylated cytosine at a CpG site is oxidation of the guanine to form 8-oxo-dG.

=== Role of oxidized guanine in DNA de-methylation ===
Initiation of DNA demethylation at a CpG site. In adult somatic cells DNA methylation typically occurs in the context of CpG dinucleotides (CpG sites), forming 5-methylcytosine-pG, or 5mCpG. Reactive oxygen species (ROS) may attack guanine at the dinucleotide site, forming 8-hydroxy-2'-deoxyguanosine (8-OHdG), and resulting in a 5mCp-8-OHdG dinucleotide site. The base excision repair enzyme OGG1 targets 8-OHdG and binds to the lesion without immediate excision. OGG1, present at a 5mCp-8-OHdG site recruits TET1 and TET1 oxidizes the 5mC adjacent to the 8-OHdG. This initiates demethylation of 5mC.

The figure in this section shows a CpG site where the cytosine is methylated to form 5-methylcytosine (5mC) and the guanine is oxidized to form 8-oxo-2'-deoxyguanosine (in the figure this is shown in the tautomeric form 8-OHdG). When this structure is formed, the base excision repair enzyme OGG1 targets 8-OHdG and binds to the lesion without immediate excision. OGG1, present at a 5mCp-8-OHdG site recruits TET1, and TET1 oxidizes the 5mC adjacent to the 8-OHdG. This initiates de-methylation of 5mC. TET1 is a key enzyme involved in de-methylating 5mCpG. However, TET1 is only able to act on 5mCpG if the guanine was first oxidized to form 8-hydroxy-2'-deoxyguanosine (8-OHdG or its tautomer 8-oxo-dG), resulting in a 5mCp-8-OHdG dinucleotide (see figure in this section). This initiates the de-methylation pathway on the methylated cytosine, finally resulting in an unmethylated cytosine (see DNA oxidation for further steps in forming unmethylated cytosine).

Altered protein expression in neurons, due to changes in methylation of DNA, (likely controlled by 8-oxo-dG-dependent de-methylation of CpG sites in gene promoters within neuron DNA) has been established as central to memory formation.

=== Role of double-strand breaks in memory formation ===
==== Generation of neuronal activity-related DSBs ====
Double-stranded breaks (DSBs) in regions of DNA related to neuronal activity are produced by a variety of mechanisms within and around the genome. The enzyme topoisomerase II, or TOPIIβ plays a key role in DSB formation by aiding in the demethylation or loosening of histones wrapped around the double helix to promote transcription. Once the chromatin structure is opened, DSBs are more likely to accumulate, however, this is normally repaired by TOPIIβ through its intrinsic religation ability that rejoins the cleaved DNA ends.

Failure of TOPIIβ to religase can have drastic consequences on protein synthesis, where it is estimated that "blocking TOPIIβ activity alters the expression of nearly one-third of all developmentally regulated genes," such as neural immediate early genes (IEGs) involved in memory consolidation. Rapid expression of egr-1, c-Fos, and Arc IEGs have been observed in response to increased neuronal activity in the hippocampus region of the brain where memory processing takes place. As a preventative measure against TOPIIβ failure, DSB repair molecules are recruited via two different pathways: non-homologous end joining (NHEJ) pathway factors, which perform a similar religation function to that of TOPIIβ, and the homologous recombination (HR) pathway, which uses the non-broken sister strand as a template to repair the damaged strand of DNA.

Stimulation of neuronal activity, as previously mentioned in IEG expression, is another mechanism through which DSBs are generated. Changes in level of activity have been used in studies as a biomarker to trace the overlap between DSBs and increased histone H3K4 methylation in promoter regions of IEGs. Other studies have indicated that transposable elements (TEs) can cause DSBs through endogenous activity that involves using endonuclease enzymes to insert and cleave target DNA at random sites.

==== DSBs and memory reconsolidation ====
While accumulation of DSBs generally inhibits long-term memory consolidation, the process of memory reconsolidation, in contrast, is DSB-dependent. Memory reconsolidation involves the modification of existing memories stored in long-term memory. Research involving NPAS4, a gene that regulates neuroplasticity in the hippocampus during contextual learning and memory formation, has revealed a link between deletions in the coding region and impairments in recall of fear memories in transgenic rats. Moreover, the enzyme H3K4me3, which catalyzes the demethylation of the H3K4 histone, was upregulated at the promoter region of the NPAS4 gene during the reconsolidation process, while knockdown (gene knockdown) of the same enzyme impeded reconsolidation. A similar effect was observed in TOPIIβ, where knockdown also impaired the fear memory response in rats, indicating that DSBs, along with the enzymes that regulate them, influence memory formation at multiple stages.

==== DSBs and neurodegeneration ====
Buildup of DSBs more broadly leads to the degeneration of neurons, hindering the function of memory and learning processes. Due to their lack of cell division and high metabolic activity, neurons are especially prone to DNA damage. Additionally, an imbalance of DSBs and DNA repair molecules for neuronal-activity genes has been linked to the development of various human neurodegenerative diseases including Alzheimer's disease (AD), Parkinson's disease (PD), and amyotrophic lateral sclerosis (ALS). In patients with Alzheimer's disease, DSBs accumulate in neurons at early stages and are the driving force behind memory loss, a key characteristic of the disease. Other external factors that result in increased levels of activity-dependent DSBs in people with AD are oxidative damage to neurons, which can result in more DSBs when multiple lesions occur close to one another. Environmental factors such as viruses and a high-fat diet have also been associated with disrupted function of DNA repair molecules.

One targeted therapy for treating patients with AD has involved suppression of the BRCA1 gene in human brains, initially tested in transgenic mice, where DSB levels were observed to have increased and memory loss had occurred, suggesting that BRCA1 could "serve as a therapeutic target for AD and AD-related dementia." Similarly, the protein ATM involved in DNA repair and epigenetic modifications to the genome is positively correlated with neuronal loss in AD brains, indicating the protein is another key component in the intrinsically linked processes of neurodegeneration, DSB production, and memory formation.

== Role of ATR and ATM ==
Most damage can be repaired without triggering the damage response system, however more complex damage activates ATR and ATM, key protein kinases in the damage response system. DNA damage inhibits M-CDKs which are a key component of progression into mitosis.

In all eukaryotic cells, ATR and ATM are protein kinases that detect DNA damage. They bind to DNA damaged sites and activate Chk1, Chk2, and, in animal cells, p53. Together, these proteins make up the DNA damage response system. Some DNA damage does not require the recruitment of ATR and ATM, it is only difficult and extensive damage that requires ATR and ATM. ATM and ATR are required for NHEJ, HR, ICL repair, and NER, as well as replication fork stability during unperturbed DNA replication and in response to replication blocks.

ATR is recruited for different forms of damage such as nucleotide damage, stalled replication forks and double strand breaks. ATM is specifically for the damage response to double strand breaks. The MRN complex (composed of Mre11, Rad50, and Nbs1) form immediately at the site of double strand break. This MRN complex recruits ATM to the site of damage. ATR and ATM phosphorylate various proteins that contribute to the damage repair system. The binding of ATR and ATM to damage sites on DNA lead to the recruitment of Chk1 and Chk2. These protein kinases send damage signals to the cell cycle control system to delay the progression of the cell cycle.

== Chk1 and Chk2 functions ==
Chk1 leads to the production of DNA repair enzymes. Chk2 leads to reversible cell cycle arrest. Chk2, as well as ATR/ATM, can activate p53, which leads to permanent cell cycle arrest or apoptosis.

== p53 role in DNA damage repair system ==
When there is too much damage, apoptosis is triggered in order to protect the organism from potentially harmful cells.7 p53, also known as a tumor suppressor gene, is a major regulatory protein in the DNA damage response system which binds directly to the promoters of its target genes. p53 acts primarily at the G1 checkpoint (controlling the G1 to S transition), where it blocks cell cycle progression. Activation of p53 can trigger cell death or permanent cell cycle arrest. p53 can also activate certain repair pathways such was NER.

=== Regulation of p53 ===
In the absence of DNA damage, p53 is regulated by Mdm2 and constantly degraded. When there is DNA damage, Mdm2 is phosphorylated, most likely caused by ATM. The phosphorylation of Mdm2 leads to a reduction in the activity of Mdm2, thus preventing the degradation of p53. Normal, undamaged cell, usually has low levels of p53 while cells under stress and DNA damage, will have high levels of p53.

=== p53 serves as transcription factor for bax and p21 ===
p53 serves as a transcription factors for both bax, a proapoptotic protein as well as p21, a CDK inhibitor. CDK Inhibitors result in cell cycle arrest. Arresting the cell provides the cell time to repair the damage, and if the damage is irreparable, p53 recruits bax to trigger apoptosis.

=== DDR and p53 role in cancer ===
p53 is a major key player in the growth of cancerous cells. Damaged DNA cells with mutated p53 are at a higher risk of becoming cancerous. Common chemotherapy treatments are genotoxic. These treatments are ineffective in cancer tumor that have mutated p53 since they do not have a functioning p53 to either arrest or kill the damaged cell.

== A major problem for life ==
One indication that DNA damages are a major problem for life is that DNA repair processes, to cope with DNA damages, have been found in all cellular organisms in which DNA repair has been investigated. For example, in bacteria, a regulatory network aimed at repairing DNA damages (called the SOS response in Escherichia coli) has been found in many bacterial species. E. coli RecA, a key enzyme in the SOS response pathway, is the defining member of a ubiquitous class of DNA strand-exchange proteins that are essential for homologous recombination, a pathway that maintains genomic integrity by repairing broken DNA. Genes homologous to RecA and to other central genes in the SOS response pathway are found in almost all the bacterial genomes sequenced to date, covering a large number of phyla, suggesting both an ancient origin and a widespread occurrence of recombinational repair of DNA damage. Eukaryotic recombinases that are homologues of RecA are also widespread in eukaryotic organisms. For example, in fission yeast and humans, RecA homologues promote duplex-duplex DNA-strand exchange needed for repair of many types of DNA lesions.

Another indication that DNA damages are a major problem for life is that cells make large investments in DNA repair processes. As pointed out by Hoeijmakers, repairing just one double-strand break could require more than 10,000 ATP molecules, as used in signaling the presence of the damage, the generation of repair foci, and the formation (in humans) of the RAD51 nucleofilament (an intermediate in homologous recombinational repair). (RAD51 is a homologue of bacterial RecA.) If the structural modification occurs during the G1 phase of DNA replication, the G1-S checkpoint arrests or postpones the furtherance of the cell cycle before the product enters the S phase.

== Consequences ==
Differentiated somatic cells of adult mammals generally replicate infrequently or not at all. Such cells, including, for example, brain neurons and muscle myocytes, have little or no cell turnover. Non-replicating cells do not generally generate mutations due to DNA damage-induced errors of replication. These non-replicating cells do not commonly give rise to cancer, but they do accumulate DNA damages with time that likely contribute to aging. In a non-replicating cell, a single-strand break or other type of damage in the transcribed strand of DNA can block RNA polymerase II-catalysed transcription. This would interfere with the synthesis of the protein coded for by the gene in which the blockage occurred.

Brasnjevic et al. summarized the evidence showing that single-strand breaks accumulate with age in the brain (though accumulation differed in different regions of the brain) and that single-strand breaks are the most frequent steady-state DNA damages in the brain. As discussed above, these accumulated single-strand breaks would be expected to block transcription of genes. Consistent with this, as reviewed by Hetman et al., 182 genes were identified and shown to have reduced transcription in the brains of individuals older than 72 years, compared to transcription in the brains of those less than 43 years old. When 40 particular proteins were evaluated in a muscle of rats, the majority of the proteins showed significant decreases during aging from 18 months (mature rat) to 30 months (aged rat) of age.

Another type of DNA damage, the double-strand break, was shown to cause cell death (loss of cells) through apoptosis. This type of DNA damage would not accumulate with age, since once a cell was lost through apoptosis, its double-strand damage would be lost with it. Thus, damaged DNA segments undermine the DNA replication machinery because these altered sequences of DNA cannot be utilized as true templates to produce copies of one's genetic material.

== RAD genes and the cell cycle response to DNA damage in Saccharomyces cerevisiae ==
When DNA is damaged, the cell responds in various ways to fix the damage and minimize the effects on the cell. One such response, specifically in eukaryotic cells, is to delay cell division—the cell becomes arrested for some time in the G2 phase before progressing through the rest of the cell cycle. Various studies have been conducted to elucidate the purpose of this G2 arrest that is induced by DNA damage. Researchers have found that cells that are prematurely forced out of the delay have lower cell viability and higher rates of damaged chromosomes compared with cells that are able to undergo a full G2 arrest, suggesting that the purpose of the delay is to give the cell time to repair damaged chromosomes before continuing with the cell cycle. This ensures the proper functioning of mitosis.

Various species of animals exhibit similar mechanisms of cellular delay in response to DNA damage, which can be caused by exposure to x-irradiation. The budding yeast Saccharomyces cerevisiae has specifically been studied because progression through the cell cycle can be followed via nuclear morphology with ease. By studying Saccharomyces cerevisiae, researchers have been able to learn more about radiation-sensitive (RAD) genes, and the effect that RAD mutations may have on the typical cellular DNA damaged-induced delay response. Specifically, the RAD9 gene plays a crucial role in detecting DNA damage and arresting the cell in G2 until the damage is repaired.

Through extensive experiments, researchers have been able to illuminate the role that the RAD genes play in delaying cell division in response to DNA damage. When wild-type, growing cells are exposed to various levels of x-irradiation over a given time frame, and then analyzed with a microcolony assay, differences in the cell cycle response can be observed based on which genes are mutated in the cells. For instance, while unirradiated cells will progress normally through the cell cycle, cells that are exposed to x-irradiation either permanently arrest (become inviable) or delay in the G2 phase before continuing to divide in mitosis, further corroborating the idea that the G2 delay is crucial for DNA repair. However, rad strains, which are deficient in DNA repair, exhibit a markedly different response. For instance, rad52 cells, which cannot repair double-stranded DNA breaks, tend to permanently arrest in G2 when exposed to even very low levels of x-irradiation, and rarely end up progressing through the later stages of the cell cycle. This is because the cells cannot repair DNA damage and thus do not enter mitosis. Various other rad mutants exhibit similar responses when exposed to x-irradiation.

However, the rad9 strain exhibits an entirely different effect. These cells fail to delay in the G2 phase when exposed to x-irradiation, and end up progressing through the cell cycle unperturbed, before dying. This suggests that the RAD9 gene, unlike the other RAD genes, plays a crucial role in initiating G2 arrest. To further investigate these findings, the cell cycles of double mutant strains have been analyzed. A mutant rad52 rad9 strain—which is both defective in DNA repair and G2 arrest—fails to undergo cell cycle arrest when exposed to x-irradiation. This suggests that even if DNA damage cannot be repaired, if RAD9 is not present, the cell cycle will not delay. Thus, unrepaired DNA damage is the signal that tells RAD9 to halt division and arrest the cell cycle in G2. Furthermore, there is a dose-dependent response; as the levels of x-irradiation—and subsequent DNA damage—increase, more cells, regardless of the mutations they have, become arrested in G2.

Another, and perhaps more helpful way to visualize this effect is to look at photomicroscopy slides. Initially, slides of RAD+ and rad9 haploid cells in the exponential phase of growth show simple, single cells, that are indistinguishable from each other. However, the slides look much different after being exposed to x-irradiation for 10 hours. The RAD+ slides now show RAD+ cells existing primarily as two-budded microcolonies, suggesting that cell division has been arrested. In contrast, the rad9 slides show the rad9 cells existing primarily as 3 to 8 budded colonies, and they appear smaller than the RAD+ cells. This is further evidence that the mutant RAD cells continued to divide and are deficient in G2 arrest.

However, there is evidence that although the RAD9 gene is necessary to induce G2 arrest in response to DNA damage, giving the cell time to repair the damage, it does not actually play a direct role in repairing DNA. When rad9 cells are artificially arrested in G2 with MBC, a microtubule poison that prevents cellular division, and then treated with x-irradiation, the cells are able to repair their DNA and eventually progress through the cell cycle, dividing into viable cells. Thus, the RAD9 gene plays no role in actually repairing damaged DNA—it simply senses damaged DNA and responds by delaying cell division. The delay, then, is mediated by a control mechanism, rather than the physical damaged DNA.

On the other hand, it is possible that there are backup mechanisms that fill the role of RAD9 when it is not present. In fact, some studies have found that RAD9 does indeed play a critical role in DNA repair. In one study, rad9 mutant and normal cells in the exponential phase of growth were exposed to UV-irradiation and synchronized in specific phases of the cell cycle. After being incubated to permit DNA repair, the extent of pyrimidine dimerization (which is indicative of DNA damage) was assessed using sensitive primer extension techniques. It was found that the removal of DNA photolesions was much less efficient in rad9 mutant cells than normal cells, providing evidence that RAD9 is involved in DNA repair. Thus, the role of RAD9 in repairing DNA damage remains unclear.

Regardless, it is clear that RAD9 is necessary to sense DNA damage and halt cell division. RAD9 has been suggested to possess 3' to 5' exonuclease activity, which is perhaps why it plays a role in detecting DNA damage. When DNA is damaged, it is hypothesized that RAD9 forms a complex with RAD1 and HUS1, and this complex is recruited to sites of DNA damage. It is in this way that RAD9 is able to exert its effects.

Although the function of RAD9 has primarily been studied in the budding yeast Saccharomyces cerevisiae, many of the cell cycle control mechanisms are similar between species. Thus, we can conclude that RAD9 likely plays a critical role in the DNA damage response in humans as well.

== See also ==
- Ageing
- Aging brain
- AP site
- Direct DNA damage
- DNA
- DNA adduct
- DNA damage theory of aging
- DNA repair
- DNA replication
- Free radical damage to DNA
- Homologous recombination
- Meiosis
- Mutation
- Natural competence
- Origin and function of meiosis
- Reactive oxygen species
- Senescence
