= Jonathan P. Stoye =

Jonathan Stoye FRS
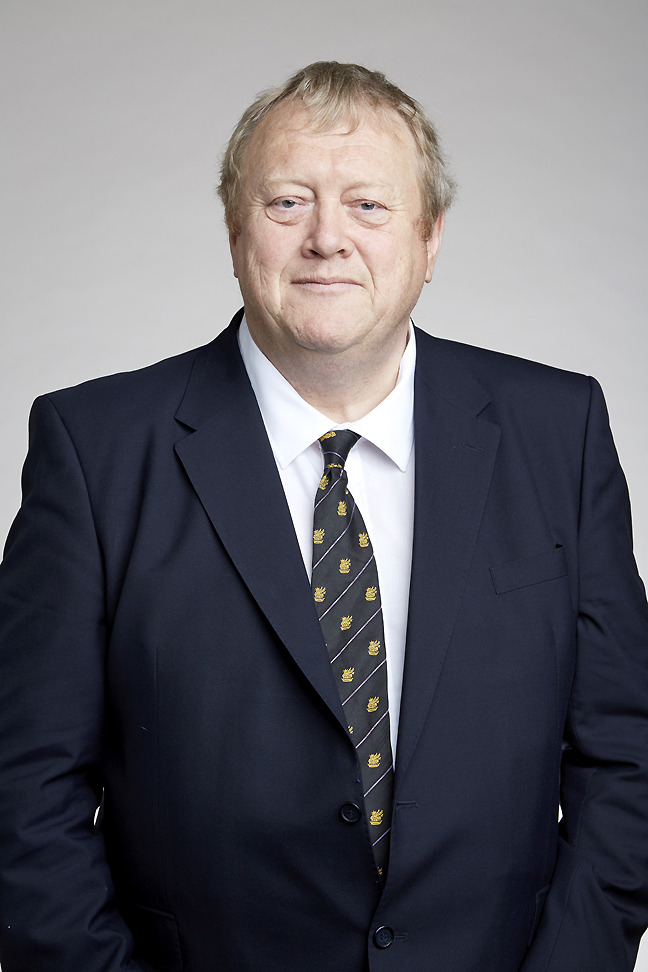
- Jonathan Stoye
- Born: Jonathan Paul Stoye; 1952 (age 73–74); Oxford, England
- Education: Magdalen College School, Oxford
- Alma mater: University of Cambridge (BA); University of Basel (PhD)
- Scientific career
- Fields: Virology
- Workplaces: Francis Crick Institute
- Thesis: Studies on cellular and genetic factors controlling endogenous retrovirus expression in lymphocytes (1981)
- Website: crick.ac.uk/research/a-z-researchers/researchers-p-s/jonathan-stoye

Jonathan Paul Stoye (born 1952) FRS is a virologist at the Francis Crick Institute in London, England. He has made substantial contributions to scientific understanding of the interactions of retroviruses with their hosts.

== Education ==
Stoye was educated at Magdalen College School, Oxford and Magdalene College, Cambridge, where he was awarded a Bachelor of Arts degree in 1973. He was awarded a PhD from the University of Basel in Switzerland in 1981 for studies on cellular and genetic factors controlling endogenous retrovirus expression in lymphocytes.

== Career and research ==
Stoye has worked with the human immunodeficiency virus (HIV), other primate retroviruses, murine leukaemia viruses and retroviruses of pigs, goats, sheep and other animals. His recent publications describe investigations of host restriction factors such as Fv1, TRIM5alpha and other members of the tripartite motif family as well as the lentiviral accessory proteins Vpx and Vpr.

=== Awards and honours ===
Stoye was elected a Fellow of the Royal Society in 2017.
