= LSH =

LSH may refer to:

== Computing ==
- LSH (hash function), in cryptography
- lsh, a UNIX secure shell
- Locality-sensitive hashing, in algorithms
- Lightweight Syntax Highlighter

== Ship types ==
- Landing Ship Headquarters, UK Royal Navy
- Landing Ship, Heavy, a hull classification symbol, Australian and US Navy

== Other uses ==
- Lashio Airport, Myanmar (IATA: LSH)
- Legion of Super-Heroes, a fictional team in DC Comics
- Lysergic acid hydroxyethylamide (LSH or LAH), an alkaloid and possible psychedelic drug

== See also ==
- Lash (disambiguation)
- Lish (disambiguation)
- LSHS (disambiguation)
- Lush (disambiguation)
