= XPE =

XPE may refer to:

- Windows XP Embedded, Microsoft's embedded operating system
- Cross-linked polyethylene
- XPE (DDB2)
