= VPRBP =

Protein-coding gene in the species Homo sapiens

DCAF1

Identifiers
- Aliases: DCAF1, VPRBP, Vpr (HIV-1) binding protein, DDB1 and CUL4 associated factor 1, RIP
- External IDs: OMIM: 617259; MGI: 2445220; GeneCards: DCAF1
Available structures
PDB	Ortholog search: PDBe RCSB
PDB	List of PDB id codes 3WA0, 4CC9, 4P7I, 4PXW, 4Z8L, 5AJA
Enzyme activity
EC #	BRENDA	ExPASy	KEGG	MetaCyc
2.7.11.1	↗	↗	↗	↗

Gene location (Human)
Chr.	Chromosome 3 (human)
Band	3p21.2	Start	51,395,867 bp
Band	3p21.2	End	51,500,015 bp

Gene location (Mouse)
Chr.	Chromosome 9 (mouse)
Band	9|9 F1	Start	106,699,073 bp
Band	9|9 F1	End	106,758,191 bp
RNA expression pattern
Bgee	Human / Mouse (ortholog); Top expressed in: sperm; right testis; left testis; pericardium; tendon of biceps brachii; vena cava; ventricular zone; gastrocnemius muscle; Skeletal muscle tissue of rectus abdominis; ganglionic eminence / Top expressed in: genital tubercle; tail of embryo; zygote; spermatid; secondary oocyte; spermatocyte; CA3 field; lactiferous gland; entorhinal cortex; perirhinal cortex; More reference expression data
BioGPS	n/a
Gene ontology
Molecular function	transferase activity; nucleotide binding; kinase activity; histone kinase activity (H2A-T120 specific); protein serine/threonine kinase activity; protein binding; ATP binding; estrogen receptor binding
Cellular component	cytoplasm; COP9 signalosome; nucleus; fibrillar center; Cul4-RING E3 ubiquitin ligase complex
Biological process	regulation of transcription, DNA-templated; phosphorylation; negative regulation of transcription by RNA polymerase II; transcription, DNA-templated; cell competition in a multicellular organism; protein ubiquitination; V(D)J recombination; B cell differentiation; viral process; chromatin organization
Sources:Amigo / QuickGO
Orthologs
Databases	NCBI: entry; OMA: entry
Species	Human	Mouse
Entrez	9730	321006
Ensembl	ENSG00000145041	ENSMUSG00000040325
UniProt	Q9Y4B6	Q80TR8
RefSeq (mRNA)	NM_001171904; NM_014703; NM_001349168; NM_001349169; NM_001349170 NM_001349171; NM_001387578; NM_001387579; NM_001387580; NM_001387581; NM_001387582; NM_001387583	NM_001015507; NM_001373930; NM_001373931
RefSeq (protein)	NP_001165375; NP_055518; NP_001336097; NP_001336098; NP_001336099 NP_001336100	NP_001015507; NP_001360859; NP_001360860
Location (UCSC)	Chr 3: 51.4 – 51.5 Mb	Chr 9: 106.7 – 106.76 Mb
PubMed search
- Wikidata
View/Edit Human	View/Edit Mouse

DDB1 and CUL4 associated factor 1 (DCAF1), originally known as Vpr Binding Protein (VprBP), is an adapter protein for the E3 Ubiquitin Ligase CRL4. DCAF1 in humans is encoded by the VPRBP gene. Both names originate from research on HIV: DCAF1 was named for its first discovered role as the primary target of HIV accessory protein Vpr. Subsequent studies identified its role in the DDB1-CUL4 axis. Targeting of DDB1 and CUL4 through DCAF1 by Vpr disrupted cell cycle entry of infected cells, thereby promoting HIV viral replication. DCAF1 has been implicated in the development of various cancers.

== Structure ==
DCAF1 is 1507 amino acids (aa) long. It contains the following domains:

- Casein Kinase-like (141-500 aa)
- Chromo-like (562-593 aa)
- Armadillo (80-141, 500-562, 593-796 aa)
- LisH (846-878 aa)
- HLH-motif (1050-1079 aa)
- H-box WD40 (1081-1388 aa)
- Acidic (1397-1507 aa)

Here is a revised version with improved clarity, flow, and organization while retaining the Wikipedia markup and citations:

== Function ==
DCAF1 functions as a substrate receptor for the CRL4 (Roc-CUL4A-DDB1) ubiquitin ligase complex, directing the ubiquitination and degradation of a wide range of cellular and viral proteins.

One of its best-characterized substrates is the proto-oncoprotein Merlin. CRL4^{DCAF1}-mediated degradation of Merlin reduces Rac1 and ERK1 signaling, two pathways that regulate cancer cell proliferation and motility. Conversely, nuclear Merlin binds DCAF1 and inhibits CRL4^{DCAF1} activity, thereby suppressing oncogene expression.

DCAF1 also regulates the tumor suppressor p53. USP2 stabilizes DCAF1, resulting in reduced p53 levels. Knockdown studies have shown that DCAF1-mediated regulation of p53 contributes to cell-cycle entry but has little effect on overall cellular growth. In addition, DCAF1 phosphorylates p53 at Ser367, promoting its ubiquitination and attenuating the DNA damage response.

DCAF1 regulates gene expression by targeting histones H2A and H3 for modification. It also promotes female fertility by activating TET genes in oocytes, thereby protecting female germ cell development.

DCAF1 is exploited by several lentiviruses. The SIV accessory protein Vpx binds DCAF1 to promote the ubiquitination and degradation of the antiviral restriction factor SAMHD1. Similarly, the HIV accessory protein Vpr co-opts DCAF1 to disrupt multiple cellular pathways, a process that contributes substantially, although is not essential, to viral replication. In contrast, cellular miRNA-1237 suppresses DCAF1 expression in HIV-infected macrophages, thereby restricting viral replication.

DCAF1 also regulates lipid metabolism by promoting the degradation of TR4 and TAK1, reducing fatty acid uptake and triglyceride synthesis and storage. This activity of the DCAF1-DDB1-CUL4B complex is inhibited by the metabolic regulator SIRT7, relieving repression of TR4 and TAK1.
