= Lish (disambiguation) =

Lish is a village in Iran.

Lish may also refer to:

== People ==
- Atticus Lish (born 1972), American novelist
- Gordon Lish (born 1934), American writer
- Freddie Lish (born 1988), American, Israeli and Thai basketball player
- Ira M. Lish (1855–1937), American politician and businessman
- Issa Lish (born 1995), Mexican fashion model
- Lish McBride, American writer

== Other topics ==
- Lish language, a language spoken in Arunachal Pradesh, India
- Lishes, hybrid varieties of English
- LisH domain, a protein domain

== See also ==
- McLish, a surname
