= DNA damage-binding protein =

damage-specific DNA binding protein 1, 127kDa

Identifiers
- Symbol: DDB1
- Alt. symbols: XPE
- NCBI gene: 1642
- HGNC: 2717
- OMIM: 600045
- RefSeq: NM_001923
- UniProt: Q16531

Other data
- Locus: Chr. 11 q12-q13
Search for
- Structures: Swiss-model
- Domains: InterPro

damage-specific DNA binding protein 2, 48kDa

Identifiers
- Symbol: DDB2
- Alt. symbols: DBB, UV-DDB2, FLJ34321
- NCBI gene: 1643
- HGNC: 2718
- OMIM: 600811
- RefSeq: NM_000107
- UniProt: Q92466

Other data
- Locus: Chr. 11 p12-p11
Search for
- Structures: Swiss-model
- Domains: InterPro

DNA damage-binding protein or UV-DDB is a protein complex that is responsible for repair of UV-damaged DNA. This complex is composed of two protein subunits, a large subunit DDB1 (p127) and a small subunit DDB2 (p48). When cells are exposed to UV radiation, DDB1 moves from the cytosol to the nucleus and binds to DDB2, thus forming the UV-DDB complex. This complex formation is highly favorable and it is demonstrated by UV-DDB's binding preference and high affinity to the UV lesions in the DNA. This complex functions in nucleotide excision repair, recognising UV-induced (6-4) pyrimidine-pyrimidone photoproducts and cyclobutane pyrimidine dimers.

== Structure ==
The helical domain at the n-terminus of DDB2 binds to UV damaged DNA with high affinity to form the UV-DDB complex. The helical binding interaction at the n-terminus of DDB2 allows for the protein to bind immediately after detecting UV damaged DNA. DNA binds to DDB2 only when damaged by UV radiation. Binding with high affinity to a helical domain of DDB2 in the dimer form, UV-DDB, is facilitated by the n-terminal alpha helical paddle and beta wings of the DDB2 subunit. Both the alpha helical fold and the beta wing loops form a "winged helix" motif. The dimerized complex acts as a scaffold for DNA damage repair pathways and allows for other proteins to detect, interact, and repair UV damaged DNA.

== DDB2 ==
DDB2 is a protein part of the CUL4A–RING ubiquitin ligase (CRL4) complex. It was thought that DDB2 only acts to recognize legions of UV damaged DNA. It has been found that DDB2 plays a role in promoting chromatin unfolding. This role is independent of DDB2's role in the CRL4 complex.

== Damage sensor role ==
UV-DDB is not only responsible for the repair of damaged DNA, it can also function by acting as a damage sensor. In base excision repair, UV-DDB galvanizes OGG1 and APE 1 activities. During DNA damage, proteins OGG1 and APE 1 encounter difficulty in repairing the lesions in a DNA wrapped nucleosome. Additionally, histones function by making the DNA inaccessible because of the way they make DNA coil and wrap into chromatin. UV-DDP plays a role in identifying the damaged sites within the chromatin, thereby allowing access to base excision repair proteins. When UV-DDB is recruited to these damaged sites, it recognizes the OGG1- AP DNA complex and further accelerates the turnover of glycosylases.
