= LSHS =

LSHS may refer to these schools:

Australia

- Lakeland Senior High School (Western Australia), Perth, Western Australia
- Loganlea State High School, Loganlea, Queensland

Canada

- Laurier Senior High School, Laval, Quebec

United Kingdom

- Long Stratton High School, Long Stratton, Norfolk, England

United States

- Frisco Lone Star High School, Frisco, Texas
- La Salle High School (Union Gap, Washington)
- La Serna High School, Whittier, California
- La Sierra High School, Riverside, California
- Lakeland Senior High School (Florida), Lakeland, Florida
- Lake Shore High School, St. Claire Shores, Michigan
- Lake Shore High School (New York), Angola, New York
- Lake Stevens High School, Lake Stevens, Washington
- Lakeville South High School, Lakeville, Minnesota
- Lee's Summit High School, Lee's Summit, Missouri
- Lima Senior High School, Lima, Ohio
- Lindenhurst Senior High School, Lindenhurst, New York
- Lithia Springs High School, Lithia Springs, Georgia
- Loyalsock Township High School, Loyalsock Township, Pennsylvania

== See also ==
- LSH (disambiguation)
