= Mouse embryonic fibroblast =

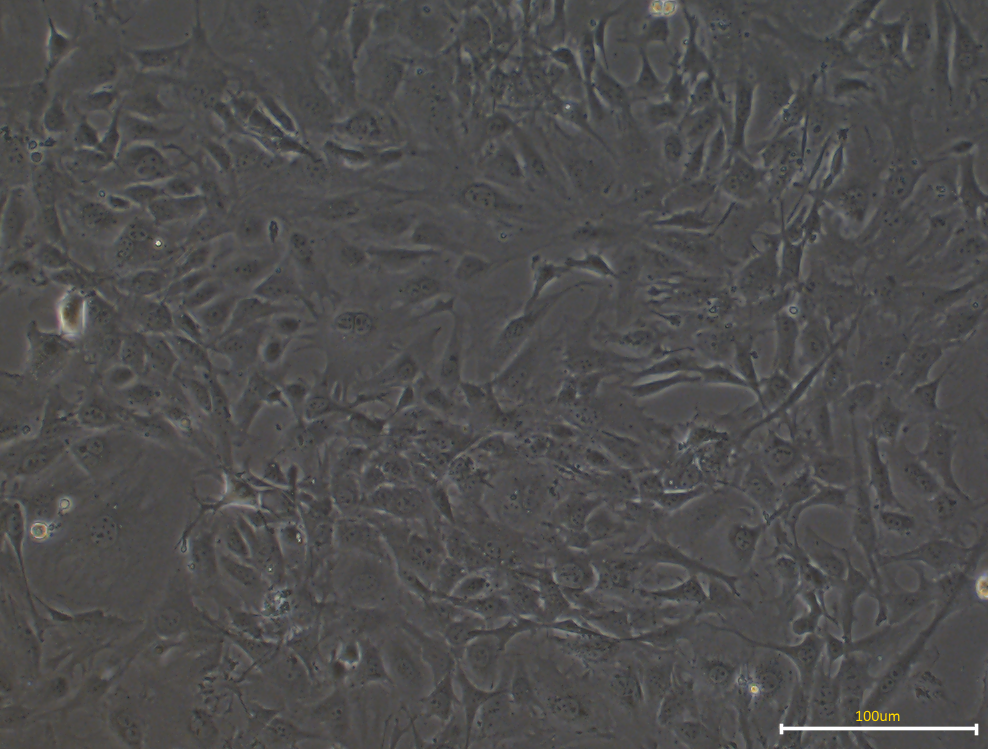
MEFs (mouse embryonic fibroblasts) on a tissue culture dish

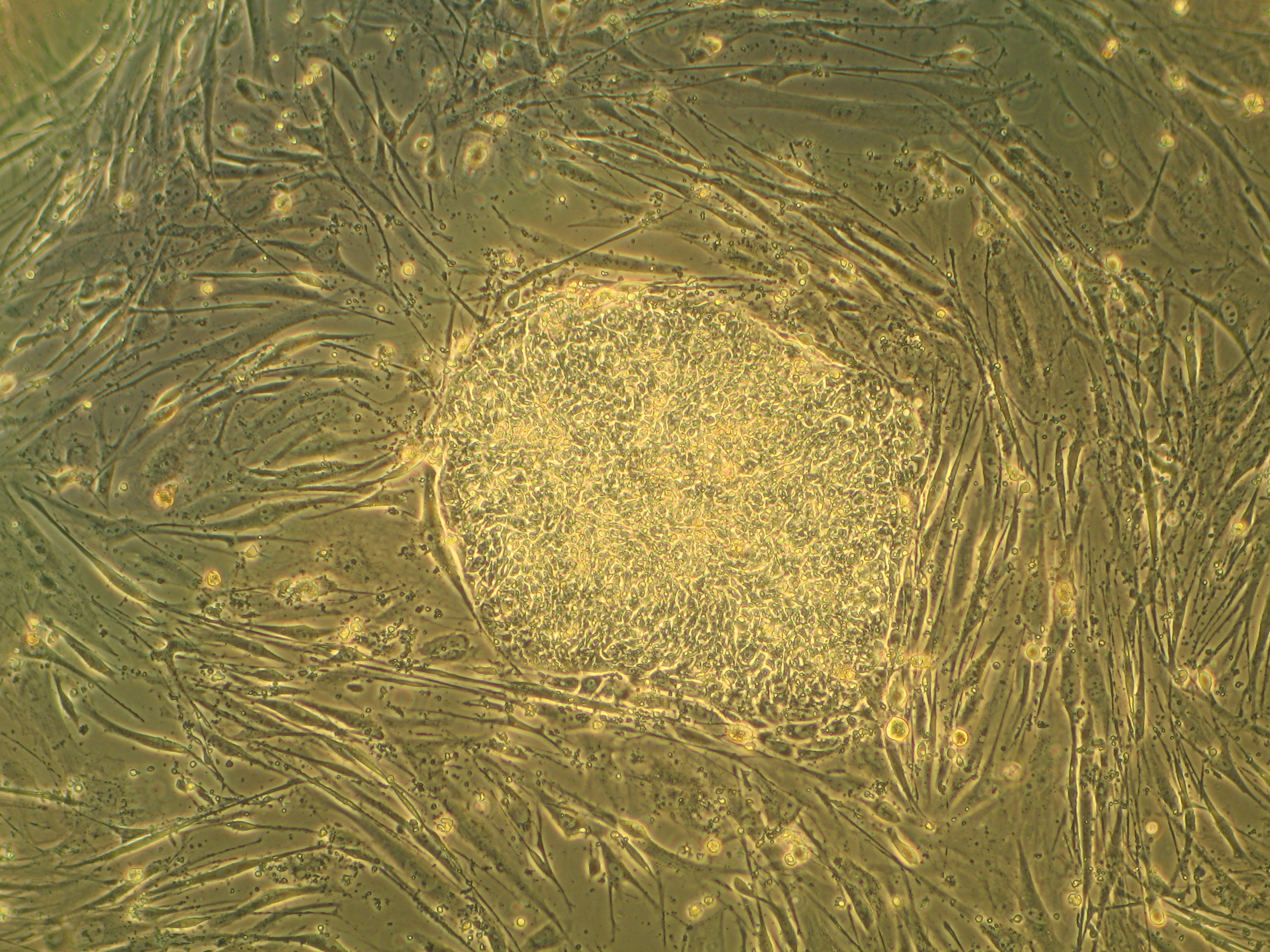
Human embryonic stem cells (the cell colonies in the center). Spindle cells surrounding the stem cell colony are mouse embryonic fibroblasts.

Mouse embryonic fibroblasts (MEFs) are a type of fibroblast prepared from mouse embryos. MEFs show a spindle shape when cultured in vitro, a typical feature of fibroblasts. MEFs are widely used in life science research, especially in stem cell biology.

The MEF is a limited cell line. After several transmissions, MEFs will senesce and finally die off. Nevertheless, researchers can use several strategies, like virus infection or repeated transmission to immortalize MEF cells, which can allow MEFs to grow indefinitely in spite of some change in character.

== Preparation and culture ==
To prepare MEFs, pregnant female mice are needed. After killing the female mouse, the researcher should incise its stomach and then detach the embryo from the placenta in a biosafety cabinet. Then the liver and head should be removed. The remains are then digested by enzymes to obtain single isolated cells which are cultured in tissue culture dishes. MEF cells can be cultured in vitro in DMEM medium with 10% FBS. To transmit MEFs, researches should use trypsin to digest the cells (making them detach from the surface) and transmit 1/5 cells digested into a new dish.

== Application in biology ==
In 1962, George Todaro and Howard Green, two researchers in New York University, immortalized MEFs by repeated transmission. These cells developed into the commonly used cell line NIH 3T3.

MEFs treated by mitomycin or gamma rays (such treatment makes MEF stop mitosis) are widely used as feeder in embryonic stem cell culture because they can mimic the microenvironment in embryos.

In 2006, Shinya Yamanaka reprogrammed MEFs into iPSCs by introducing 4 factors, which is remarkable in the development of stem cell biology.

== See also ==
- Embryonic stem cell
