= Fibroblast =

Animal connective tissue cell

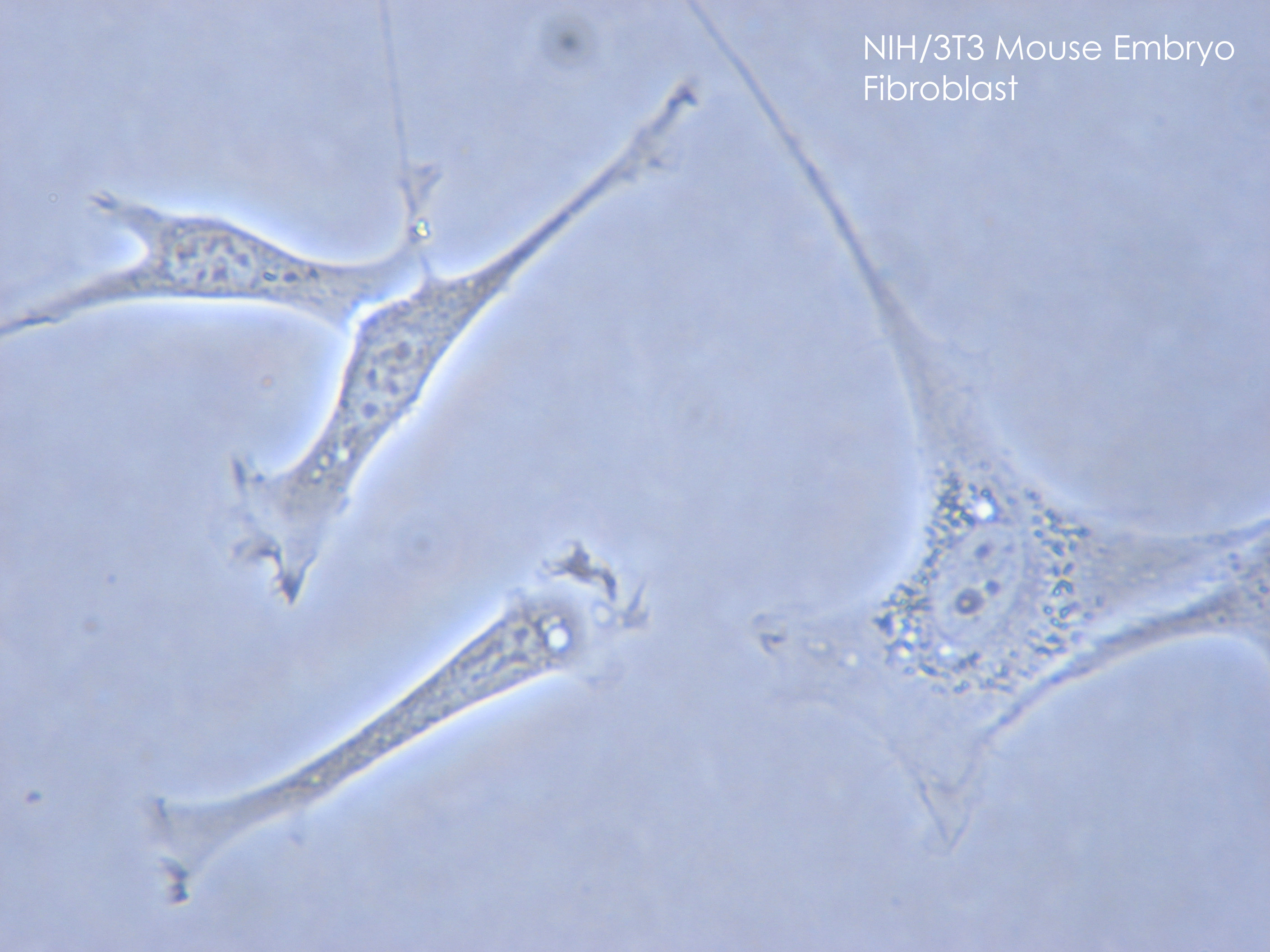
- NIH/3T3 Fibroblasts in cell culture

Details
- Location: Connective tissue
- Function: Extracellular matrix and collagen creation

Identifiers
- Latin: fibroblastus
- MeSH: D005347
- TH: H2.00.03.0.01002
- FMA: 63877

A fibroblast is a type of biological cell typically with a spindle shape that synthesizes the extracellular matrix and collagen, produces the structural framework (stroma) for animal tissues, and plays a critical role in wound healing. Fibroblasts are the most common cells of connective tissue in animals.

== Structure ==
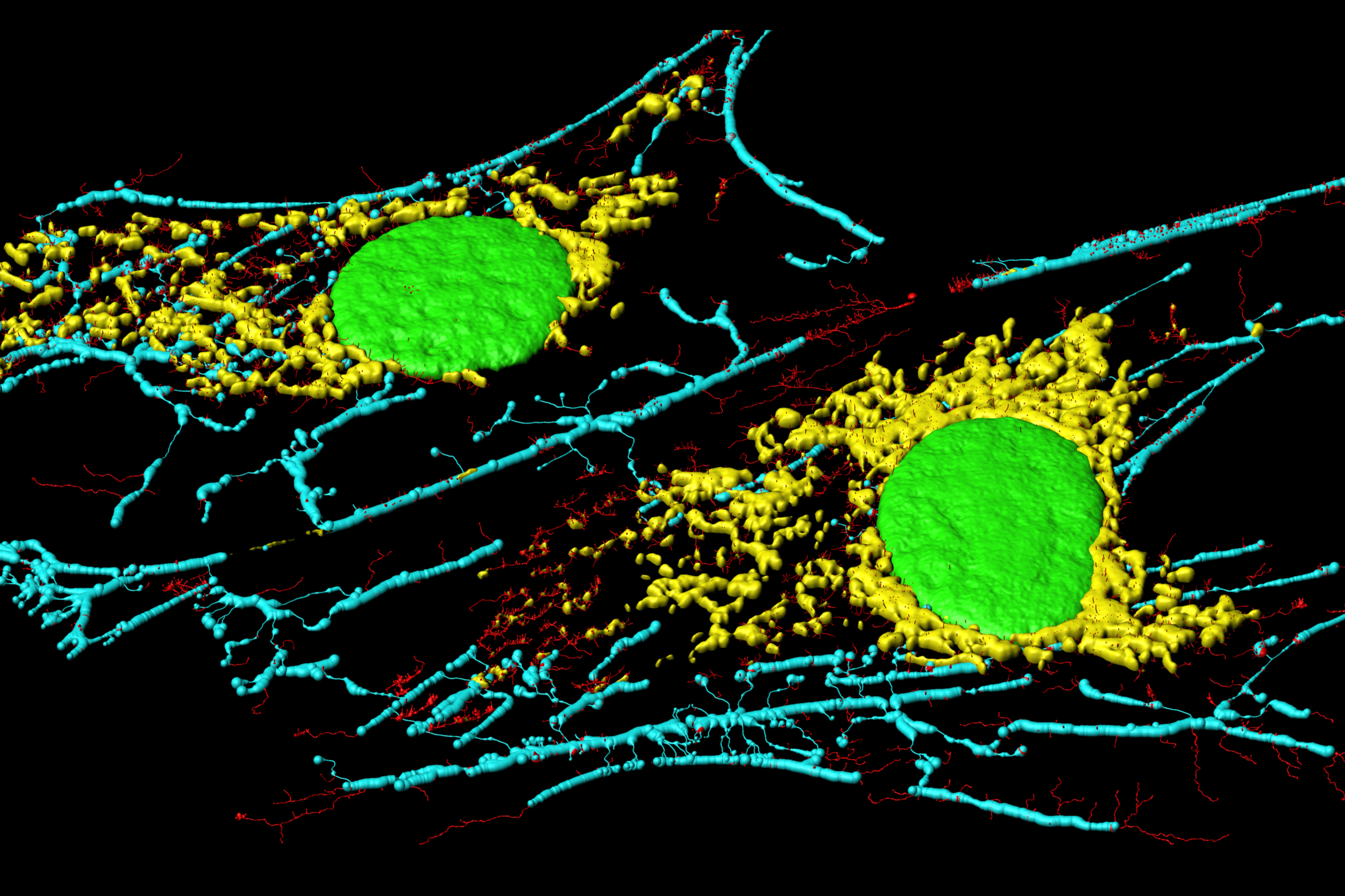
Microfilaments (blue and red), mitochondria (yellow), and nuclei (green) in fibroblast cells

Fibroblasts have a branched cytoplasm surrounding an elliptical, speckled nucleus having two or more nucleoli. Active fibroblasts can be recognized by their abundant rough endoplasmic reticulum (RER). Inactive fibroblasts, called 'fibrocytes', are smaller, spindle-shaped, and have less RER. Although disjointed and scattered when covering large spaces, fibroblasts often locally align in parallel clusters when crowded together.

Unlike the epithelial cells lining the body structures, fibroblasts do not form flat monolayers and are not restricted by a polarizing attachment to a basal lamina on one side, although they may contribute to basal lamina components in some situations (e.g. subepithelial myofibroblasts in intestine may secrete the α-2 chain-carrying component of the laminin, which is absent only in regions of follicle-associated epithelia which lack the myofibroblast lining). Fibroblasts can also migrate slowly over substratum as individual cells, again in contrast to epithelial cells. While epithelial cells form the lining of body structures, fibroblasts and related connective tissues sculpt the "bulk" of an organism.

The life span of a fibroblast, as measured in chick embryos, is 57 ± 3 days.

=== Relationship with fibrocytes ===
Fibroblasts and fibrocytes are two states of the same cells, the former being the activated state, the latter the less active state, concerned with maintenance and tissue metabolism. Currently, there is a tendency to call both forms fibroblasts. The suffix "-blast" is used in cellular biology to denote a stem cell or a cell in an activated state of metabolism.

Fibroblasts are morphologically heterogeneous with diverse appearances depending on their location and activity. Though morphologically inconspicuous, ectopically transplanted fibroblasts can often retain positional memory of the location and tissue context where they had previously resided, at least over a few generations. This remarkable behavior may lead to discomfort in the rare event that they stagnate there excessively.

=== Development ===
The main function of fibroblasts is to maintain the structural integrity of connective tissues by continuously secreting precursors of the extracellular matrix (ECM), providing all such components, primarily the ground substance and a variety of fibers. The composition of the ECM determines the physical properties of connective tissues.

Like other cells of connective tissue, fibroblasts are derived from primitive mesenchyme. Hence, they express the intermediate filament protein vimentin, a feature used as a marker to distinguish their mesodermal origin. However, this test is not specific as epithelial cells cultured in vitro on adherent substratum may also express vimentin after some time.

In certain situations, epithelial cells can give rise to fibroblasts, a process called epithelial-mesenchymal transition.

Conversely, fibroblasts in some situations may give rise to epithelia by undergoing a mesenchymal to epithelial transition and organizing into a condensed, polarized, laterally connected true epithelial sheet. This process is seen in many developmental situations (e.g. nephron and notocord development), as well as in wound healing and tumorigenesis.

== Function ==
Fibroblasts make collagen fibers, glycosaminoglycans, reticular and elastic fibers. The fibroblasts of growing individuals divide and synthesize ground substance. Tissue damage stimulates fibrocytes and induces the production of fibroblasts.

=== Inflammation ===
Besides their commonly known role as structural components, fibroblasts play a critical role in an immune response to a tissue injury. They are early players in initiating inflammation in the presence of invading microorganisms. They induce chemokine synthesis through the presentation of receptors on their surface. Immune cells then respond and initiate a cascade of events to clear the invasive microorganisms. Receptors on the surface of fibroblasts also allow regulation of hematopoietic cells and provide a pathway for immune cells to regulate fibroblasts.

=== Tumour mediation ===
Fibroblasts, like tumor-associated host fibroblasts (TAF), play a crucial role in immune regulation through TAF-derived ECM components and modulators. TAF are known to be significant in the inflammatory response as well as immune suppression in tumors. TAF-derived ECM components cause alterations in ECM composition and initiate the ECM remodeling. ECM remodeling is described as changes in the ECM as a result of enzyme activity which can lead to degradation of the ECM. Immune regulation of tumors is largely determined by ECM remodeling because the ECM is responsible for regulating a variety of functions, such as proliferation, differentiation, and morphogenesis of vital organs. In many tumor types, especially those related to the epithelial cells, ECM remodeling is common. Examples of TAF-derived ECM components include Tenascin and Thrombospondin-1 (TSP-1), which can be found in sites of chronic inflammation and carcinomas, respectively.

Immune regulation of tumors can also occur through the TAF-derived modulators. Although these modulators may sound similar to the TAF-derived ECM components, they differ in the sense that they are responsible for the variation and turnover of the ECM. Cleaved ECM molecules can play a critical role in immune regulation. Proteases like matrix metalloproteinases and the uPA system are known to cleave the ECM. These proteases are derived from fibroblasts.

=== Use of fibroblasts as feeder cells ===
Mouse embryonic fibroblasts (MEFs) are often used as supportive "feeder cells" in research using human embryonic stem cells, induced pluripotent stem cells and primary epithelial cell culture. However, many researchers are trying to phase out MEFs in favor of culture media with precisely defined ingredients in order to facilitate the development of clinical-grade products.

In view of the potential clinical applications of stem cell-derived tissues or primary epithelial cells, the use of human fibroblasts as an alternative to MEF feeders has been studied. Whereas the fibroblasts are usually used to maintain pluripotency of the stem cells, they can also be used to facilitate development of the stem cells into specific type of cells such as cardiomyocytes.

=== Host immune response ===
Fibroblasts from different anatomical sites in the body express many genes that code for immune mediators and proteins. These mediators of immune response enable the cellular communication with hematopoietic immune cells. The immune activity of non-hematopoietic cells, such as fibroblasts, is referred to as "structural immunity". In order to facilitate a fast response to immunological challenges, fibroblasts encode crucial aspects of the structural cell immune response in the epigenome.

== See also ==
- Cancer-associated fibroblast
- Fibrocartilage callus
- List of distinct cell types in the adult human body
