= DDB1 =

Protein-coding gene in the species Homo sapiens

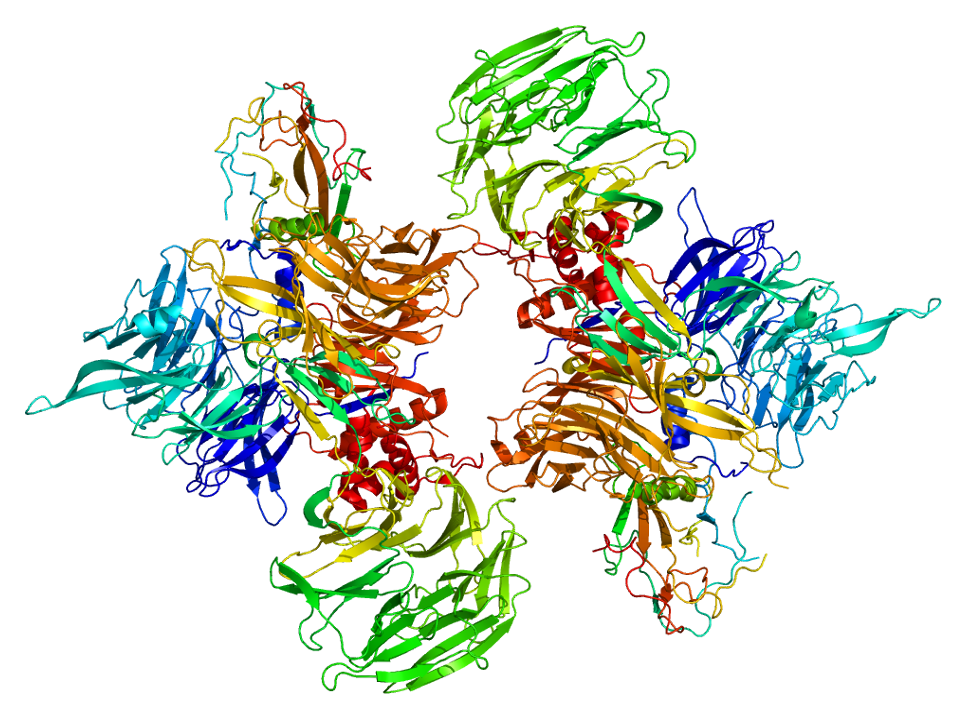

Identifiers
- Aliases: DDB1, DDBA, UV-XAP1, XPCE, XPE, XPE-BF, damage specific DNA binding protein 1, WHIKERS
- External IDs: OMIM: 600045; MGI: 1202384; GeneCards: DDB1
Available structures
PDB	Ortholog search: PDBe RCSB
PDB	List of PDB id codes 2B5L, 2B5M, 2B5N, 2HYE, 3E0C, 3EI1, 3EI2, 3EI3, 3EI4, 3I7H, 3I7K, 3I7L, 3I7N, 3I7O, 3I7P, 3I89, 3I8C, 3I8E, 4A08, 4A09, 4A0A, 4A0B, 4A0K, 4A0L, 4A11, 4CI1, 4CI2, 4CI3, 4E54, 4E5Z, 4TZ4, 5FQD, 5HXB

Gene location (Human)
Chr.	Chromosome 11 (human)
Band	11q12.2	Start	61,299,451 bp
Band	11q12.2	End	61,342,596 bp

Gene location (Mouse)
Chr.	Chromosome 19 (mouse)
Band	19 A|19 6.66 cM	Start	10,582,691 bp
Band	19 A|19 6.66 cM	End	10,607,183 bp
RNA expression pattern
Bgee	Human / Mouse (ortholog); Top expressed in: right adrenal gland; right adrenal cortex; left adrenal gland; left adrenal cortex; ventricular zone; stromal cell of endometrium; right testis; ganglionic eminence; left testis; right uterine tube / Top expressed in: Ileal epithelium; neural layer of retina; spermatocyte; choroid plexus of fourth ventricle; gastrula; ventricular zone; epiblast; tail of embryo; lactiferous gland; hand; More reference expression data
BioGPS	n/a
Gene ontology
Molecular function	DNA binding; protein binding; nucleic acid binding; damaged DNA binding; protein-macromolecule adaptor activity; cullin family protein binding; WD40-repeat domain binding; protein-containing complex binding
Cellular component	cytoplasm; nucleoplasm; Cul4A-RING E3 ubiquitin ligase complex; Cul4B-RING E3 ubiquitin ligase complex; extracellular exosome; nucleus; extracellular space; Cul4-RING E3 ubiquitin ligase complex; protein-containing complex
Biological process	regulation of mitotic cell cycle phase transition; nucleotide-excision repair; nucleotide-excision repair, DNA damage recognition; positive regulation by virus of viral protein levels in host cell; histone H2A monoubiquitination; negative regulation of apoptotic process; Wnt signaling pathway; global genome nucleotide-excision repair; biological process involved in interaction with symbiont; positive regulation of viral genome replication; transcription-coupled nucleotide-excision repair; viral process; nucleotide-excision repair, DNA incision; UV-damage excision repair; DNA repair; proteasome-mediated ubiquitin-dependent protein catabolic process; nucleotide-excision repair, DNA incision, 3'-to lesion; nucleotide-excision repair, preincision complex stabilization; nucleotide-excision repair, DNA duplex unwinding; nucleotide-excision repair, preincision complex assembly; nucleotide-excision repair, DNA incision, 5'-to lesion; post-translational protein modification; proteasomal protein catabolic process; cellular response to DNA damage stimulus; protein ubiquitination; positive regulation of protein catabolic process; ubiquitin-dependent protein catabolic process; regulation of circadian rhythm; positive regulation of gluconeogenesis; rhythmic process
Sources:Amigo / QuickGO
Orthologs
Databases	NCBI: entry; OMA: entry
Species	Human	Mouse
Entrez	1642	13194
Ensembl	ENSG00000167986	ENSMUSG00000024740
UniProt	Q16531	Q3U1J4
RefSeq (mRNA)	NM_001923	NM_015735
RefSeq (protein)	NP_001914	NP_056550
Location (UCSC)	Chr 11: 61.3 – 61.34 Mb	Chr 19: 10.58 – 10.61 Mb
PubMed search
- Wikidata
View/Edit Human	View/Edit Mouse

DNA damage-binding protein 1 is a protein that in humans is encoded by the DDB1 gene.

== Gene ==
The gene's position is on chromosome 11q12-q13.

== Protein ==
The DDB1 gene encodes the large subunit of DNA damage-binding protein, a heterodimer composed of a large and a small (DDB2) subunit. DDB1 contains 1140 amino acids, amounting to a mass of 127 kDa.

== Function ==
As its name suggests, DDB1 was initially implicated in the process of a specific type of DNA repair known as nucleotide excision repair. Since then, researchers have found that DDB1 primarily functions as a core component of the CUL4A- and CUL4B-based E3 ubiquitin ligase complexes. DDB1 serves as a bridge or adaptor protein which interacts with dozens of proteins known as DDB1 and CUL4-associated factors (DCAFs). These DCAFs are often ubiquitin ligase substrates and regulate numerous essential processes in the cell including DNA repair (DDB2), DNA replication, chromatin remodeling (Cdt2) and more.

== Interactions ==
DDB1 has been shown to interact with Transcription initiation protein SPT3 homolog, GCN5L2, DDB2, CUL4A, CUL4B and P21.
