= Vpr =

Group of transport proteins

VPR
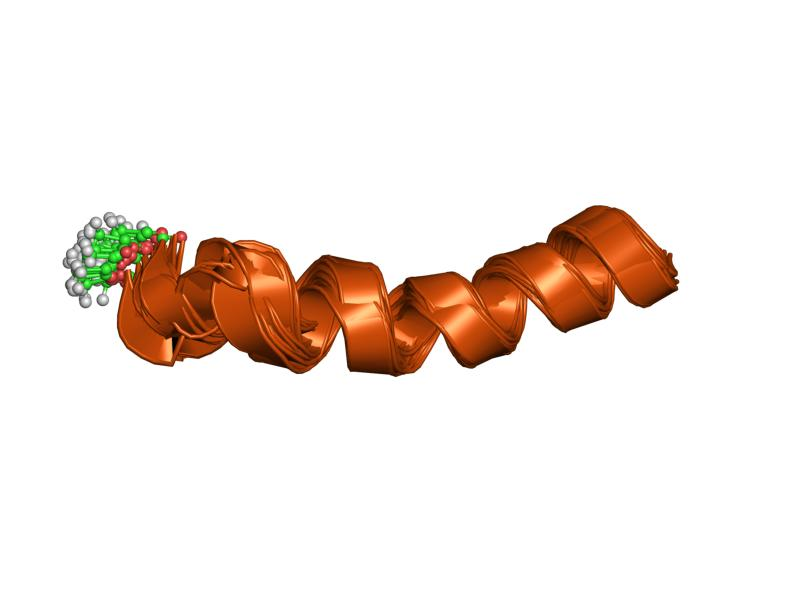
- solution structure of hiv-1 vpr (13-33) peptide in micells

Identifiers
- Symbol: VPR
- Pfam: PF00522
- InterPro: IPR000012
- SCOP2: 1dsk / SCOPe / SUPFAM
- TCDB: 1.A.42
Available protein structures:
- PDB: IPR000012 PF00522 (ECOD; PDBsum)
- AlphaFold: IPR000012; PF00522

Vpr is a Human immunodeficiency virus gene and protein product. Vpr stands for "Viral Protein R". Vpr, a 96 amino acid 14-kDa protein, plays an important role in regulating nuclear import of the HIV-1 pre-integration complex, and is required for virus replication and enhanced gene expression from provirus in dividing or non-dividing cells such as T cells or macrophages. Vpr also induces G2 cell cycle arrest and apoptosis in proliferating cells, which can result in immune dysfunction.

Vpr is also immunosuppressive due to its ability to sequester a proinflammatory transcriptional activator in the cytoplasm. HIV-2 contains both a Vpr protein and a related (by sequence homology) Vpx protein (Viral Protein X). Two functions of Vpr in HIV-1 are split between Vpr and Vpx in HIV-2, with the HIV-2 Vpr protein inducing cell cycle arrest and the Vpx protein required for nuclear import.

== Vpr-binding protein ==
Vpr-binding protein (VprBP) is a 1,507-amino-acid human protein that contains conserved domains, including YXXY repeats, the Lis homology motif, and WD40 repeats. VprBP acts as a substrate-recognition unit when associated with DNA damage-binding protein 1 (DDB1) as part of a CUL4–DDB1 E3 ubiquitin ligase complex. When bound to Vpr, VprBP allows Vpr to modulate the catalytic activity of the CUL4–DDB1 complex, inducing G2 cell cycle arrest in infected cells.

VprBP also regulates p53-induced transcription and apoptotic pathways. p53 is an important tumor suppressor which induces either cell cycle arrest or apoptosis in response to DNA damage.

== In-vitro studies of Vpr ==
The lack of an in vitro cell culture system that demonstrated a deficit in replication upon infection with viruses in the absence of Vpr has led to some mystery in the function of Vpr. Recently, there has been experiments on monocyte-derived dendritic cells (MDDCs) using a novel in-vitro infection system. These infected human dendritic cells showed a slower rate of replication when deprived of the Vpr protein in HIV-1 cells. This replication difference occurred in a single round of infection. This was shown to be due to decreased transcriptional output from the integrated HIV viral genome. Using mutational analysis (biochemical identification of mutational changes in a nucleotide sequence), prevention of cell cycle progression into mitosis was shown to be required for LTR-mediated viral expression. These findings suggest that the evolutionarily secured G2 cell cycle arrest function of Vpr (Viral Protein R) is essential for HIV-1 replication. Furthermore, this innovative in-vitro culture system will allow researchers to address mechanisms underlying Vpr-mediated enhancement of HIV-1 replication.
