= DTL (gene) =

Protein-coding gene in humans

Identifiers
- Aliases: DTL, CDT2, DCAF2, L2RAMP, denticleless E3 ubiquitin protein ligase homolog
- External IDs: OMIM: 610617; MGI: 1924093; GeneCards: DTL

Gene location (Human)
Chr.	Chromosome 1 (human)
Band	1q32.3	Start	212,035,553 bp
Band	1q32.3	End	212,107,400 bp

Gene location (Mouse)
Chr.	Chromosome 1 (mouse)
Band	1|1 H6	Start	191,269,468 bp
Band	1|1 H6	End	191,307,656 bp
RNA expression pattern
Bgee	Human / Mouse (ortholog); Top expressed in: secondary oocyte; trabecular bone; embryo; testicle; ventricular zone; bone marrow; ganglionic eminence; gonad; bone marrow cell; sperm / Top expressed in: mandibular prominence; maxillary prominence; zygote; secondary oocyte; ureter; lumbar spinal ganglion; primitive streak; primary oocyte; hand; fetal liver hematopoietic progenitor cell; More reference expression data
BioGPS	n/a
Gene ontology
Molecular function	ubiquitin-protein transferase activity; protein binding
Cellular component	centrosome; nuclear membrane; membrane; chromosome; microtubule organizing center; nucleolus; Cul4A-RING E3 ubiquitin ligase complex; Cul4B-RING E3 ubiquitin ligase complex; cytoskeleton; nucleus; nucleoplasm; cytoplasm; cytosol; Cul4-RING E3 ubiquitin ligase complex
Biological process	ubiquitin-dependent protein catabolic process; protein polyubiquitination; protein monoubiquitination; regulation of cell cycle; DNA replication; protein ubiquitination; response to UV; translesion synthesis; post-translational protein modification; cellular response to DNA damage stimulus; positive regulation of G2/M transition of mitotic cell cycle; positive regulation of protein catabolic process; mitotic G2 DNA damage checkpoint signaling; rhythmic process
Sources:Amigo / QuickGO
Orthologs
Databases	NCBI: entry; OMA: entry
Species	Human	Mouse
Entrez	51514	76843
Ensembl	ENSG00000143476	ENSMUSG00000037474
UniProt	Q9NZJ0	Q3TLR7
RefSeq (mRNA)	NM_001286229; NM_001286230; NM_016448	NM_029766; NM_001305233
RefSeq (protein)	NP_001273158; NP_001273159; NP_057532	NP_001292162; NP_084042
Location (UCSC)	Chr 1: 212.04 – 212.11 Mb	Chr 1: 191.27 – 191.31 Mb
PubMed search
- Wikidata
View/Edit Human	View/Edit Mouse

Denticleless protein homolog is a protein that in humans is encoded by the DTL gene.

== Interactions ==
DTL (gene) has been shown to interact with P21.
