= KMT5A =

Protein-coding gene in humans

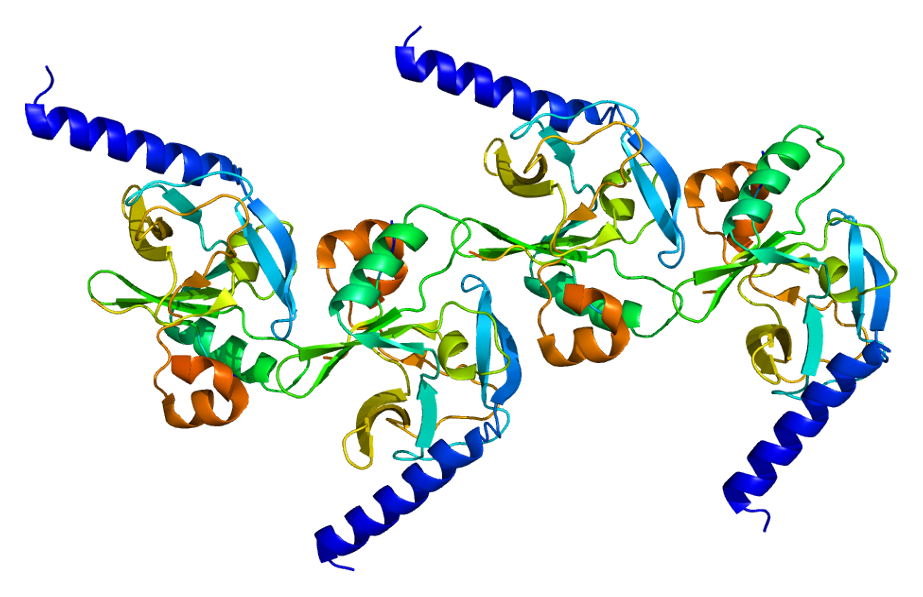

Identifiers
- Aliases: KMT5A, PR-Set7, SET07, SET8, SETD8, lysine methyltransferase 5A, PR/SET07
- External IDs: OMIM: 607240; MGI: 1915206; GeneCards: KMT5A
Available structures
PDB	Ortholog search: PDBe RCSB
PDB	List of PDB id codes 1ZKK, 2BQZ, 3F9W, 3F9X, 3F9Y, 3F9Z, 4IJ8, 5HQ2
Enzyme activity
EC #	BRENDA	ExPASy	KEGG	MetaCyc
2.1.1.354	↗	↗	↗	↗
2.1.1.361	↗	↗	↗	↗

Gene location (Human)
Chr.	Chromosome 12 (human)
Band	12q24.31	Start	123,384,132 bp
Band	12q24.31	End	123,409,353 bp

Gene location (Mouse)
Chr.	Chromosome 5 (mouse)
Band	5|5 F	Start	124,577,993 bp
Band	5|5 F	End	124,600,371 bp
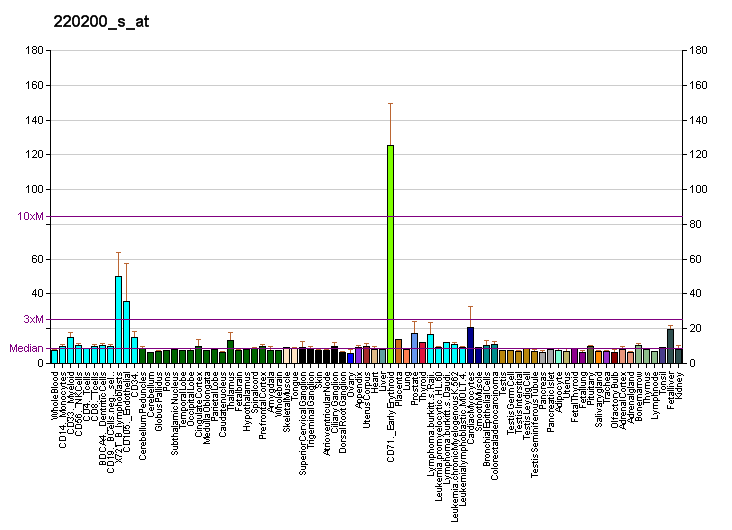
RNA expression pattern
Bgee	Human / Mouse (ortholog); Top expressed in: sural nerve; ventricular zone; right coronary artery; thoracic aorta; ascending aorta; Descending thoracic aorta; Achilles tendon; right lobe of thyroid gland; body of pancreas; popliteal artery / Top expressed in: tail of embryo; genital tubercle; gastrula; granulocyte; muscle of thigh; pyloric antrum; zygote; lip; knee joint; ventricular zone; More reference expression data
BioGPS	More reference expression data
Gene ontology
Molecular function	protein-lysine N-methyltransferase activity; methyltransferase activity; transcription corepressor activity; p53 binding; protein binding; transferase activity; lysine N-methyltransferase activity; histone-lysine N-methyltransferase activity; histone methyltransferase activity (H4-K20 specific)
Cellular component	nucleus; nucleoplasm; chromosome; cytosol
Biological process	methylation; regulation of transcription, DNA-templated; peptidyl-lysine monomethylation; cell cycle; negative regulation of transcription by RNA polymerase II; negative regulation of transcription, DNA-templated; cell division; transcription, DNA-templated; regulation of DNA damage response, signal transduction by p53 class mediator; histone lysine methylation; regulation of signal transduction by p53 class mediator; histone H4-K20 methylation; chromatin organization
Sources:Amigo / QuickGO
Orthologs
Databases	NCBI: entry; OMA: entry
Species	Human	Mouse
Entrez	387893	67956
Ensembl	ENSG00000183955	ENSMUSG00000049327
UniProt	Q9NQR1	Q2YDW7
RefSeq (mRNA)	NM_020382; NM_001324504; NM_001324505; NM_001324506; NM_001367386 NM_001367388; NM_001367389	NM_030241; NM_001310723; NM_001310725; NM_001310727
RefSeq (protein)	NP_001311433; NP_001311434; NP_001311435; NP_065115; NP_001354315 NP_001354317; NP_001354318	NP_001297652; NP_001297654; NP_001297656; NP_084517; NP_001392317 NP_001392319
Location (UCSC)	Chr 12: 123.38 – 123.41 Mb	Chr 5: 124.58 – 124.6 Mb
PubMed search
- Wikidata
View/Edit Human	View/Edit Mouse

N-lysine methyltransferase KMT5A is an enzyme that in humans is encoded by the KMT5A gene. The enzyme is a histone methyltransferase, SET domain-containing and lysine-specific. The enzyme transfers one methyl group to histone H4 lysine residue at position 20. S-Adenosyl methionine (SAM) is both the cofactor and the methyl group donor. The lysine residue is converted to N^{6}-methyllysine residue.

Leftmost: side chain of lysine. Next: N^{6}-methyllysine side chain.

This histone modification is often abbreviated H4K20me1:

- H4 - type of histone
- K - symbol of lysine
- 20 - position of the lysine residue modified
- me - abbreviation for methyl group
- 1 - number of methyl groups transferred
