= LisH domain =

LisH
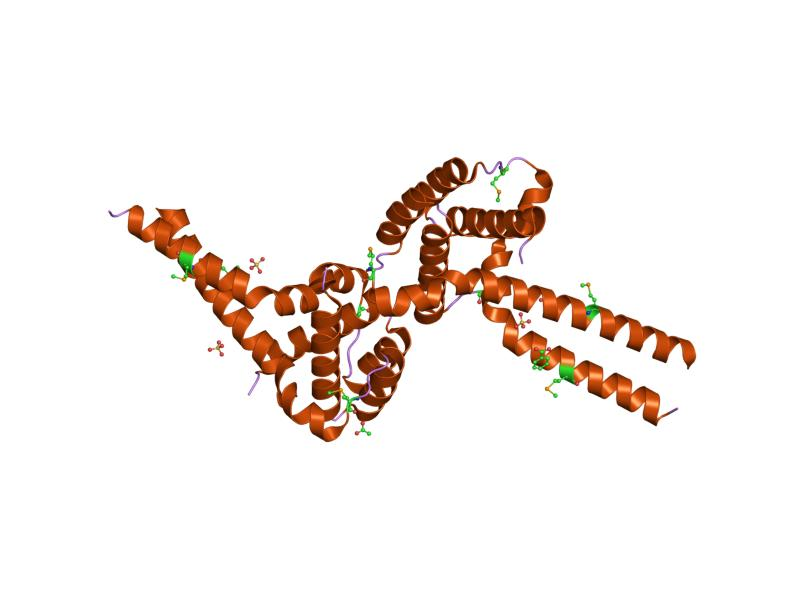
- n-terminal domain of lissencephaly-1 protein (lis-1)

Identifiers
- Symbol: LisH
- Pfam: PF08513
- InterPro: IPR013720
Available protein structures:
- Pfam: structures / ECOD
- PDB: RCSB PDB; PDBe; PDBj
- PDBsum: structure summary

In molecular biology, the LisH domain (lis homology domain) is a protein domain found in a large number of eukaryotic proteins, from metazoa, fungi and plants that have a wide range of functions. The recently solved structure of the LisH domain in the N-terminal region of LIS1 depicted it as a novel dimerisation motif, and that other structural elements are likely to play an important role in dimerisation.

The LisH domain is found in the Saccharomyces cerevisiae SIF2 protein, a component of the SET3 complex which is responsible for repressing meiotic genes In SIF2 the LisH domain has been shown to mediate dimer and tetramer formation. It has been shown that the LisH domain helps mediate interaction with components of the SET3 complex.
