= DDB2 =

Protein-coding gene in the species Homo sapiens

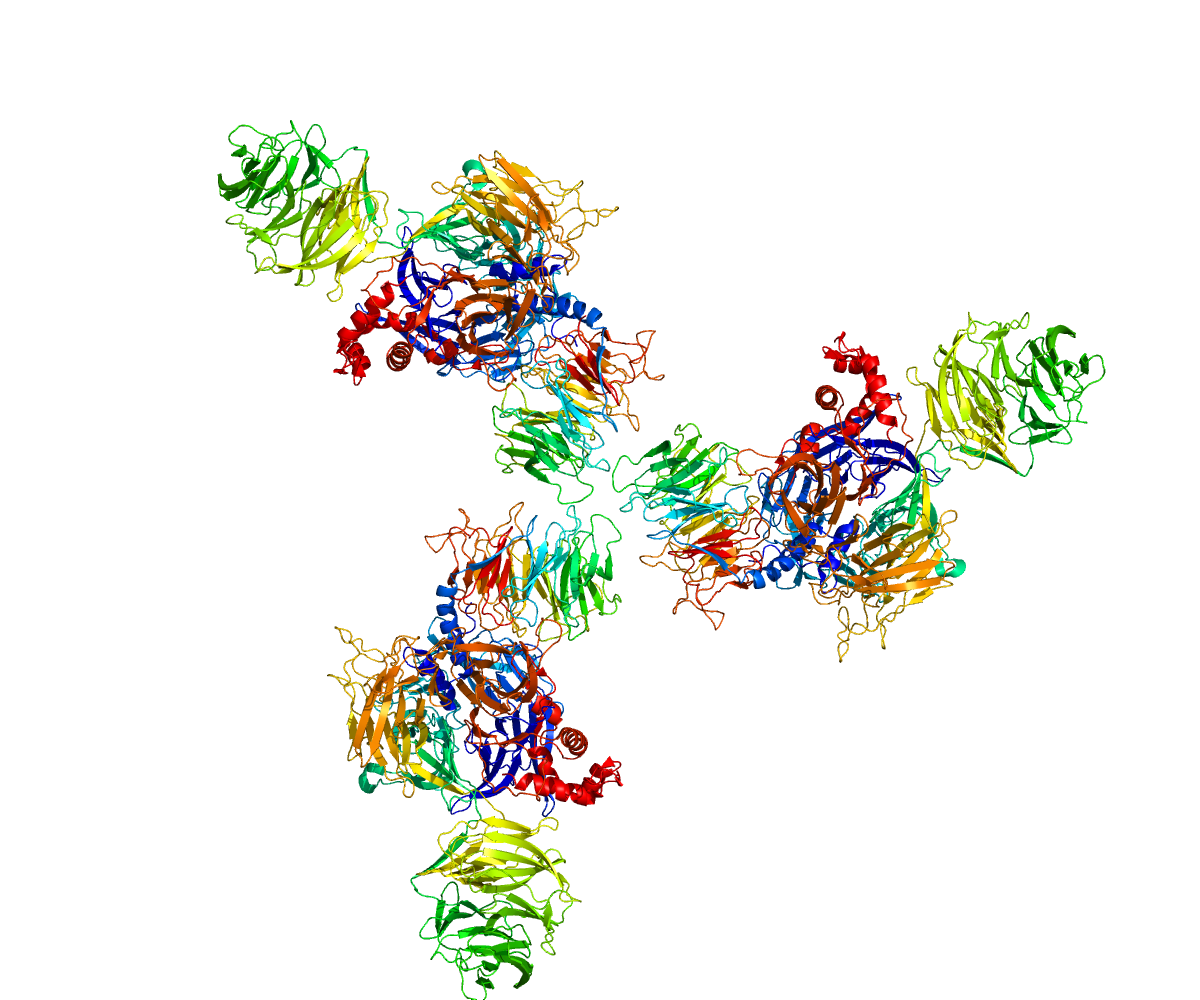

Identifiers
- Aliases: DDB2, DDBB, UV-XPE, damage specific DNA binding protein 2
- External IDs: OMIM: 600811; MGI: 1355314; GeneCards: DDB2
Available structures
PDB	Ortholog search: PDBe RCSB
PDB	List of PDB id codes 3EI4, 3I7L, 4E54, 4E5Z

Gene location (Human)
Chr.	Chromosome 11 (human)
Band	11p11.2	Start	47,214,465 bp
Band	11p11.2	End	47,239,217 bp

Gene location (Mouse)
Chr.	Chromosome 2 (mouse)
Band	2|2 E1	Start	91,041,917 bp
Band	2|2 E1	End	91,067,327 bp
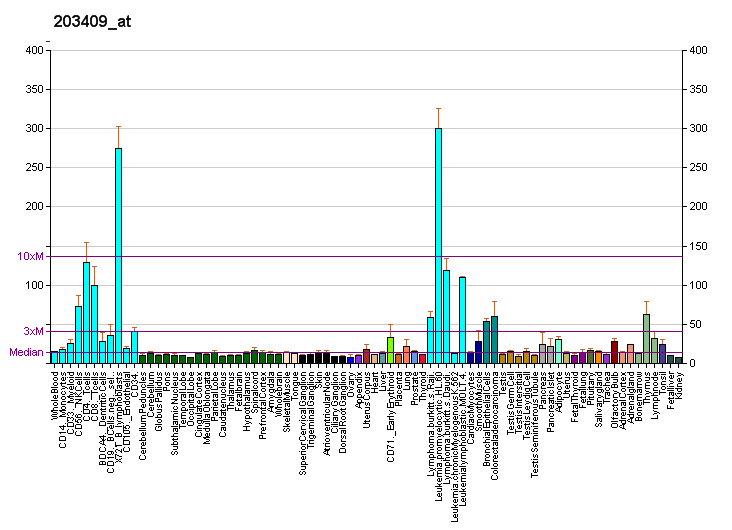
RNA expression pattern
Bgee	Human / Mouse (ortholog); Top expressed in: skin of abdomen; skin of leg; right uterine tube; right adrenal cortex; Descending thoracic aorta; olfactory zone of nasal mucosa; granulocyte; left adrenal gland; ascending aorta; left adrenal cortex / Top expressed in: Paneth cell; secondary oocyte; zygote; medullary collecting duct; primary oocyte; ascending aorta; saccule; aortic valve; otic vesicle; ciliary body; More reference expression data
BioGPS	More reference expression data
Gene ontology
Molecular function	DNA binding; ubiquitin-protein transferase activity; protein binding; damaged DNA binding; protein-containing complex binding
Cellular component	nucleoplasm; cell junction; Cul4B-RING E3 ubiquitin ligase complex; nucleus; Cul4-RING E3 ubiquitin ligase complex; protein-containing complex
Biological process	nucleotide-excision repair; pyrimidine dimer repair; nucleotide-excision repair, DNA damage recognition; histone H2A monoubiquitination; protein polyubiquitination; cellular response to DNA damage stimulus; global genome nucleotide-excision repair; protein ubiquitination; nucleotide-excision repair, DNA incision; UV-damage excision repair; response to UV; DNA repair; protein autoubiquitination; nucleotide-excision repair, DNA incision, 5'-to lesion; nucleotide-excision repair, preincision complex stabilization; nucleotide-excision repair, preincision complex assembly; protein deubiquitination; post-translational protein modification; response to UV-B; nucleotide-excision repair, DNA duplex unwinding; nucleotide-excision repair, DNA incision, 3'-to lesion
Sources:Amigo / QuickGO
Orthologs
Databases	NCBI: entry; OMA: entry
Species	Human	Mouse
Entrez	1643	107986
Ensembl	ENSG00000134574	ENSMUSG00000002109
UniProt	Q92466	Q99J79
RefSeq (mRNA)	NM_000107; NM_001300734	NM_028119; NM_001362705
RefSeq (protein)	NP_000098; NP_001287663	NP_082395; NP_001349634
Location (UCSC)	Chr 11: 47.21 – 47.24 Mb	Chr 2: 91.04 – 91.07 Mb
PubMed search
- Wikidata
View/Edit Human	View/Edit Mouse

DNA damage-binding protein 2 is a protein that in humans is encoded by the DDB2 gene.

== Structure ==
As indicated by Rapić-Otrin et al. in 2003, the DDB2 gene is located on human chromosome 11p11.2, spans a region of approximately 24 – 26 kb and includes 10 exons. The DDB2 protein contains five putative WD40 repeats (sequences of about 40 amino acids that can interact with each other) positioned downstream from the second exon. The WD40 motif identified in DDB2 is characteristic of proteins involved in the recognition of chromatin proteins. The C-terminal region of DDB2 (a 48 kDa molecular weight protein) is essential for binding to DDB1 (a larger 127 kDa protein). Together, the two proteins form a UV-damaged DNA binding protein complex (UV-DDB).

== Deficiency in humans ==
If humans have a mutation in each copy of their DDB2 gene, this causes a mild form of the human disease xeroderma pigmentosum, called XPE. Patients in the XPE group have mild dermatological manifestations and are neurologically unaffected. Mutation in the DDB2 gene causes a deficiency in nucleotide excision repair of DNA. This deficiency is also mild, showing 40 to 60% of normal repair capability and a modest sensitivity to UV light in comparison to the sensitivities of cells defective in the other XP genes XPA, XPB, XPC, XPD, XPF and XPG.

== Function ==
=== Binding to damaged DNA ===
As shown by Wittschieben et al., when DDB2 is in a complex with DDB1, forming the heterodimer DDB, this complex binds strongly to DNA containing one type of UV light-induced photoproduct [the (6-4) photoproduct], to DNA with an abasic site, to DNA containing mismatches without a covalent lesion, and to “compound” lesions containing both mismatches and lesions. The heterodimer DDB binds with intermediate strength to DNA containing another UV light-induced photoproduct (the cyclobutane pyrimidine dimer), and binds weakly to DNA that has no DNA damage. The DDB2 component of the heterodimer contains the specificity for binding to damaged DNA, since a heterodimer DDB complex containing amino acid substitutions in the DDB2 subunit, as found in XP-E patients, is very deficient in binding to damaged DNA. DDB1 and DDB2, each acting alone, do not bind DNA.

=== Chromatin remodeling ===
The packaging of eukaryotic DNA into chromatin presents a barrier to all DNA-based processes that require recruitment of enzymes to their sites of action. To allow the critical cellular process of DNA repair, the chromatin must be relaxed.

DDB2, in its heterodimeric complex with DDB1, and further complexed with the ubiquitin ligase protein CUL4A and with PARP1 rapidly associates with UV-induced damage within chromatin, with half-maximum association completed in 40 seconds. The PARP1 protein, attached to both DDB1 and DDB2, then PARylates (creates a poly-ADP ribose chain) on DDB2 that attracts the DNA remodeling protein ALC1. Action of ALC1 relaxes the chromatin at the site of UV damage to DNA. This relaxation allows other proteins in the nucleotide excision repair pathway to enter the chromatin and repair the DNA damaged by the UV-induced presence of cyclobutane pyrimidine dimers.

=== Other functions ===
In 2015, Zhu et al. showed that DDB2 down-regulates the acetylation of lysine 56 in histone H3 (H3K56Ac) after UV-induced DNA damage through DDB2 interaction with histone deacetylases 1 and 2. Decreased acetylation of histones decreases transcription of associated genes in the DNA wrapped around the histones.

In 2016, Zou et al. showed that DDB2 is involved in cell cycle arrest and homologous recombinational DNA repair after cells are subjected to ionizing radiation.

In 2016, Christmann et al. showed that exposure of cells to the carcinogenic benzo(a)pyrene metabolite BPDE caused prompt and sustained upregulation of DDB2. This contributed to enhanced removal of BPDE adducts from DNA.

In 2017, Fantini et al. showed that DDB2, in association with XRCC5 and XRCC6 (otherwise known as Ku80 and Ku70, which make up the Ku heterodimer), has transcriptional activities. The DDB2/Ku effects on transcription are separate from the actions of the Ku heterodimer in non-homologous end joining DNA repair.
