= Vpx =

HIV-2 and SIV protein

Identifiers
- Organism: Human immunodeficiency virus type 2 subtype A (isolate ROD)
- Symbol: ?
- UniProt: P06939
Search for
- Structures: Swiss-model
- Domains: InterPro

Vpx is a virion-associated protein encoded by human immunodeficiency virus type 2 HIV-2 and most simian immunodeficiency virus (SIV) strains, but that is absent from HIV-1. It is similar in structure to the protein Vpr that is carried by SIV and HIV-2 as well as HIV-1. Vpx is one of five accessory proteins (Vif, Vpx, Vpr, Vpu, and Nef) carried by lentiviruses that enhances viral replication by inhibiting host antiviral factors.

Vpx enhances HIV-2 replication in humans by counteracting the host factor SAMHD1. SAMHD1 is a host factor found in human myeloid cells, such as dendritic cells and macrophages, that restricts HIV-1 replication by depleting the cytoplasmic pool of deoxynucleoside triphosphates needed for viral DNA production. SAMHD1 does not, however, restrict HIV-2 replication in myeloid cells due to the presence of viral Vpx. Vpx counteracts restriction by inducing the ubiquitin-proteasome-dependent degradation of SAMHD1. Vpx-mediated degradation of SAMHD1 therefore decreases deoxynucleoside triphosphate hydrolysis, thereby increasing the availability of dNTPs for viral reverse transcription in the cytoplasm. It has been postulated that SAMHD1 degradation is required for HIV-2 replication because the HIV-2 reverse transcriptase (RT) is less active than the HIV-1 RT, which would be the reason for the absence of Vpx from HIV-1. Because Vpx is required for HIV-2 reverse transcription and the early stages of the viral life cycle, it is packaged into virions in significant amounts.

Vpx is also involved in the nuclear import of the HIV-2/SIV genomes and associated proteins, but the specific mechanisms and interactions are currently unknown. Although Vpr and Vpx are similar in size (both are ~100 amino acids with 20-25% sequence similarity) and structure (both are predicted to have similar tertiary structure with three major helices), they serve very different roles in viral replication. Vpx targets a host restriction factor for proteasomal degradation, while Vpr arrests the host cell cycle in the G2 phase. However, they are both involved in the import of the viral preintegration complex into the host nucleus.
