= SAMHD1 =

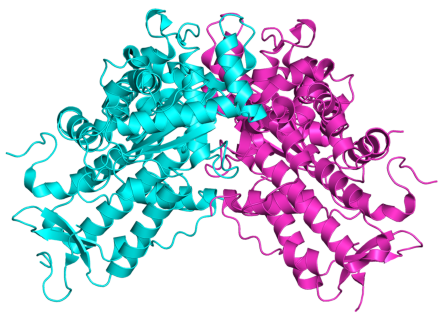

Identifiers
- Aliases: SAMHD1, CHBL2, DCIP, HDDC1, MOP-5, SBBI88, SAM and HD domain containing deoxynucleoside triphosphate triphosphohydrolase 1, hSAMHD1
- External IDs: OMIM: 606754; MGI: 1927468; GeneCards: SAMHD1
Available structures
PDB	Ortholog search: PDBe RCSB
PDB	List of PDB id codes 2E8O, 3U1N, 4BZB, 4BZC, 4CC9, 4MZ7, 4Q7H, 4QFX, 4QFY, 4QFZ, 4QG0, 4QG1, 4QG2, 4QG4, 4RXO, 4RXP, 4RXQ, 4RXR, 4RXS, 4TNP, 4TNQ, 4TNR, 4TNX, 4TNY, 4TNZ, 4TO0, 4TO1, 4TO2, 4TO3, 4TO4, 4TO5, 4TO6, 4ZWE, 4ZWG, 5AO4, 5AO1, 5AO0, 5AO2, 5AO3

Gene location (Human)
Chr.	Chromosome 20 (human)
Band	20q11.23	Start	36,890,229 bp
Band	20q11.23	End	36,951,893 bp

Gene location (Mouse)
Chr.	Chromosome 2 (mouse)
Band	2|2 H1	Start	156,939,453 bp
Band	2|2 H1	End	156,977,185 bp
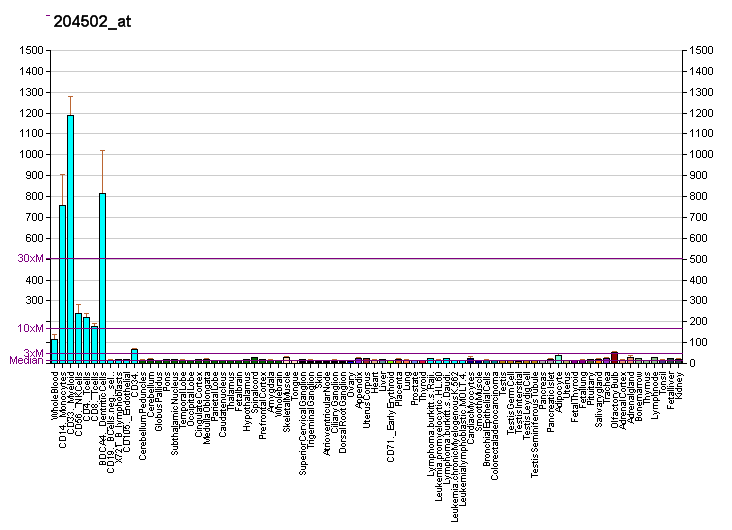
RNA expression pattern
Bgee	Human / Mouse (ortholog); Top expressed in: monocyte; pericardium; epithelium of nasopharynx; bronchial epithelial cell; lower lobe of lung; palpebral conjunctiva; tibial nerve; trigeminal ganglion; visceral pleura; superficial temporal artery / Top expressed in: granulocyte; gastrula; spleen; mesenteric lymph nodes; blood; stroma of bone marrow; yolk sac; decidua; tail of embryo; jejunum; More reference expression data
BioGPS	More reference expression data
Gene ontology
Molecular function	zinc ion binding; metal ion binding; protein binding; catalytic activity; dGTP binding; RNA binding; nucleic acid binding; dGTPase activity; hydrolase activity; ribonuclease activity; triphosphoric monoester hydrolase activity; identical protein binding; nucleotide binding; single-stranded DNA binding; GTP binding
Cellular component	plasma membrane; intracellular anatomical structure; nucleoplasm; nucleus; chromosome; site of double-strand break; tetraspanin-enriched microdomain
Biological process	regulation of innate immune response; immune system process; dATP catabolic process; dGTP catabolic process; defense response to virus; type I interferon signaling pathway; immune response; metabolism; innate immune response; protein homotetramerization; RNA phosphodiester bond hydrolysis; deoxyribonucleotide catabolic process; double-strand break repair via homologous recombination; DNA replication; DNA repair; cellular response to DNA damage stimulus; somatic hypermutation of immunoglobulin genes; negative regulation of type I interferon-mediated signaling pathway; DNA strand resection involved in replication fork processing
Sources:Amigo / QuickGO
Orthologs
Databases	NCBI: entry; OMA: entry
Species	Human	Mouse
Entrez	25939	56045
Ensembl	ENSG00000101347	ENSMUSG00000027639
UniProt	Q9Y3Z3	Q60710
RefSeq (mRNA)	NM_015474; NM_001363729; NM_001363733	NM_001139520; NM_018851; NM_001370610
RefSeq (protein)	NP_056289; NP_001350658; NP_001350662	NP_001132992; NP_061339; NP_001357539
Location (UCSC)	Chr 20: 36.89 – 36.95 Mb	Chr 2: 156.94 – 156.98 Mb
PubMed search
- Wikidata
View/Edit Human	View/Edit Mouse

SAM domain and HD domain-containing protein 1 is a protein that in humans is encoded by the SAMHD1 gene. SAMHD1 is a cellular enzyme, responsible for blocking replication of HIV in dendritic cells, macrophages, monocytes and resting CD4^{+} T lymphocytes. It is an enzyme that exhibits phosphohydrolase activity, converting deoxynucleoside triphosphates (dNTPs) to inorganic phosphate (iPPP) and a 2'-deoxynucleoside (i.e. deoxynucleosides without a phosphate group). In doing so, SAMHD1 depletes the pool of dNTPs available to a reverse transcriptase for viral cDNA synthesis and thus prevents viral replication. SAMHD1 has also shown nuclease activity. Although a ribonuclease activity was described to be required for HIV-1 restriction, data confirmed that SAMHD1-mediated HIV-1 restriction in cells does not involve ribonuclease activity.

In addition to its role in nucleotide metabolism, SAMHD1 also promotes DNA double-strand break (DSB) repair in a dNTPase-independent fashion. Active recruitment of DNA repair factors (CtIP) to DNA damage sites is shown in SAMHD1-proficient cells to facilitate HR-mediated double strand-break (DSB) repair independent of its triphosphohydrolase activity. This signifies the importance of SAMHD1 protein for normal cellular metabolism and genome integrity

== Nomenclature ==
The SAMHD1 protein is also known as:

- AGS5: Aicardi- Goutières syndrome type 5
- DCIP: Dendritic cell-derived IFNG-induced protein2
- Mg21: Interferon-gamma-inducible protein
- HDDC1: HD domain containing 1
- MOP-5: Monocyte protein 5
- SAMH1_HUMAN
- SBBI88
- CHBL2

== Gene ==
The gene encoding human SAMHD1 was originally identified in a human dendritic cell cDNA library as an orthologue of a mouse gene IFN-γ-induced gene Mg11. The SAMHD1 gene is located on chromosome 20. SAMHD1 spans 59,532 bp of genomic sequence (chromosome 20:34,954,059–35,013,590) in 16 exons and encodes a 626 amino-acid (aa) protein with a molecular weight of 72.2 kDa. SAMHD1 expressed in both cycling and noncycling cells, but the antiviral activity of SAMHD1 is limited to noncycling cells.

== Structure ==
The SAMHD1 is 626 amino acids (aa) long and has 2 domains:

a. Sterile alpha motif (SAM) domain: residues 45 – 110 aa. In general, SAM domains are known to function as protein–protein and protein–nucleic acid interactions in organisms from yeast to humans, docking sites for kinases, signal transduction and regulation of transcription.

b. Histidine- Aspartic (HD) domain-containing protein 1: residues 164 – 319 aa. HD domains proteins are characterized by a doublet of histidine and aspartic acid catalytic residues, and have been shown to possess putative nuclease, dGTP triphosphatase, phosphatase or phosphodiesterase activities.

A crystal structure of a SAMHD1 fragment comprising catalytic core reveals that the protein is dimeric. Also studies have shown that SAMHD1 oligomerizes and forms tetramers. SAMHD1 is phosphorylated on residue T592 in cycling cells but that this phosphorylation is lost when cells are in a noncycling state.

== Function ==
Mutations in SAMHD1 are found in Aicardi–Goutières syndrome (AGS), "a hereditary autoimmune encephalopathy that is characterized by aberrant production of type I interferon (IFN) and symptoms mimicking congenital viral infection". Monocytes isolated from individuals with AGS are highly susceptible to HIV-1.

SAMHD1 was identified as a host protein that is bound and blocked by lentiviral protein, Vpx. Vpx promotes macrophage and DC infection by targeting SAMHD1.

The human SAMHD1 protein has dNTP triphosphatase activity, specifically dGTP-stimulated dNTP triphosphohydrolase activity, and nuclease activity against single-stranded DNA and RNA which is associated with its HD domain. Other studies demonstrated that silencing SAMHD1 enhanced HIV-1 and SIV Δvpx infection of myeloid cells, also enhances HIV-1 infection of resting CD4^{+} T cells.

== Role in disease ==
=== Aicardi-Goutieres syndrome ===
16 mutations in the SAMHD1 gene have been identified in patients with Aicardi-Goutieres syndrome. Mutations result in a SAMHD1 less functional protein. However, it is not known how this protein dysfunction leads to immune system abnormalities, inflammatory damage to the brain and skin, and other characteristics of this syndrome.

=== Restriction of viral infection ===
SAMHD1 was identified as the cellular protein responsible of the reverse transcription block to HIV-1 infection observed in myeloid cells as well as in quiescent CD4^{+} T cells. SAMHD1 inhibits HIV-1 infection in myeloid cells by limiting the intracellular pool of dNTPs. The dNTP triphosphohydrolase activity of SAMHD1 has been proposed to reduce the intracellular dNTP level, restricting HIV-1 replication and preventing activation of the immune system, a nuclease activity against single-stranded (ss)DNAs and RNAs, as well as against RNA in DNA/RNA hybrids. Retroviral restriction ability of SAMHD1 is regulated by phosphorylation, for this purpose SAMHD1 associates with the cyclin A2/CDK1 complex that mediates its phosphorylation at threonine 592. Phosphorylated SAMHD1 has been observed to have minimal to no activity in cycling cells. Conversely, unphosphorylated SAMHD1 in non-cycling cells have potent restriction activity.

=== Expression modulation and antimetabolite degradation in cancer cells ===
SAMHD1 protein expression can be influenced at four levels in cancer cells. First, mutations in the SAMHD1 gene can prevent SAMHD1 mRNA generation or a functional protein after translations. Second, promoter methylation can prevent SAMHD1 mRNA transcription. Third, miRNA-155 and miRNA-181a can prevent the translation, thus preventing protein production. Finally, SAMHD1 degradation occurs during the S phase of the cell cycle. Non-adherent tumor cell lines – B cells, T cells and myeloid cells can be rapidly dividing cells, have low to no detectable levels of SAMHD1 protein, as compared to adherent cells. Regulation of dNTP concentration by SAMHD1 in cancer cells might be an important mechanism with therapeutic implications. Antimetabolites are anticancer nucleosides, nucleotides, and base analogs used as anticancer agents to promote cell death by several different mechanisms of action. For some of these antimetabolites, the intracellular triphosphate form of the analog is the active compound. SAMHD1 has been shown to be able to hydrolyze arabinose 5'-triphosphates. SAMHD1 has been shown to be a biomarker and influence arabinose C (ara-C; cytarabine) responsiveness. Viral protein x (Vpx) has been proposed to be potential therapy to improve cytarabine therapy for hematological malignancies.
