= BSD domain =

BSD
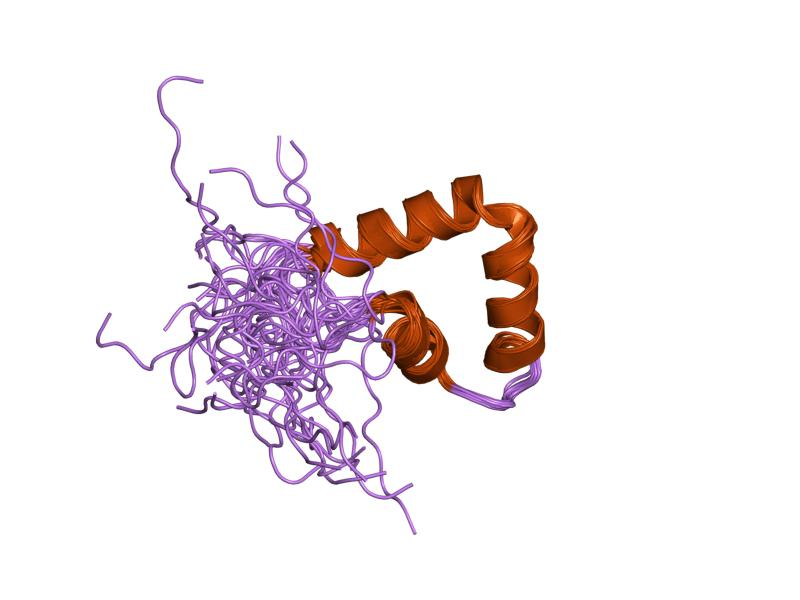
- solution structure of the bsd domain of human tfiih basal transcription factor complex p62 subunit

Identifiers
- Symbol: BSD
- Pfam: PF03909
- InterPro: IPR005607
Available protein structures:
- Pfam: structures / ECOD
- PDB: RCSB PDB; PDBe; PDBj
- PDBsum: structure summary

In molecular biology, the BSD domain is an approximately 60-amino-acid-long protein domain named after the BTF2-like transcription factors, synapse-associated proteins and DOS2-like proteins in which it is found. It is also found in several hypothetical proteins. It occurs in one or two copies in a variety of species ranging from primal protozoan to human, and can be found associated with other domains such as the BTB domain or the U-box in multidomain proteins. Its function is as yet unknown.

Secondary structure prediction indicates the presence of three predicted alpha helices, which probably form a three-helical bundle in small |domains. The third predicted helix contains neighbouring phenylalanine and tryptophan residues—less common amino acids that are invariant in all the BSD domains identified and that are the domain's most striking sequence features.

Some proteins known to contain one or two BSD domains are:

- Mammalian TFIIH basal transcription factor complex p62 subunit (GTF2H1).
- Yeast RNA polymerase II transcription factor B 73 kDa subunit (TFB1), the homologue of BTF2.
- Yeast DOS2 protein, involved in single-copy DNA replication and ubiquitination.
- Drosophila synapse-associated protein SAP47.
- Mammalian SYAP1.
- Various Arabidopsis thaliana (mouse-ear cress) hypothetical proteins.
