= Tbf5 protein domain =

Protein domain

Tbf5
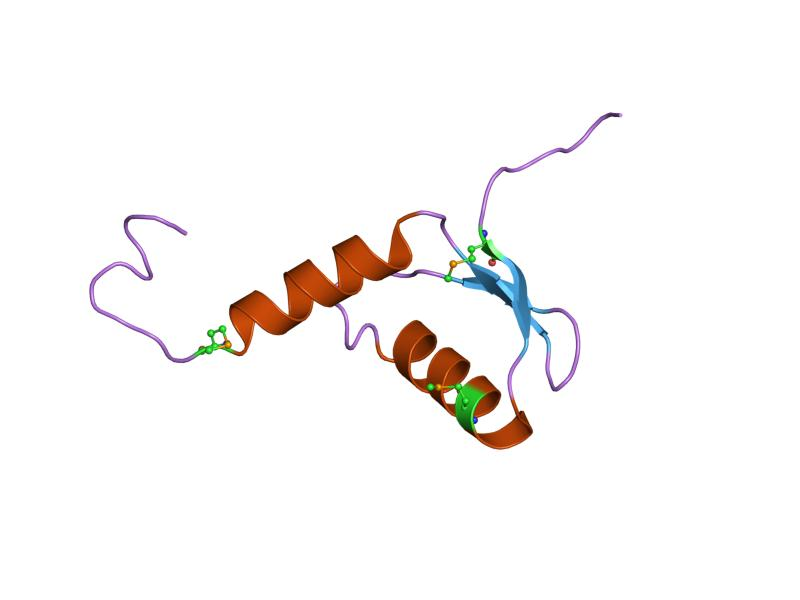
- Crystal structure of the human TFIIH.

Identifiers
- Symbol: Tbf5
- Pfam: PF06331
- InterPro: IPR009400
Available protein structures:
- PDB: IPR009400 PF06331 (ECOD; PDBsum)
- AlphaFold: IPR009400; PF06331

In molecular biology, this protein domain represents Tbf5 which stands for TTDA subunit of TFIIH basal transcription factor complex (also known as subunit 5 of RNA polymerase II transcription factor B), and Rex1 a type of nucleotide excision repair (NER) proteins. Nucleotide excision repair is a major pathway for repairing UV light-induced DNA damage in most organisms. The function of this protein is to aid transcription.

== Structure ==
These proteins have a structural motif consisting of a 2-layer sandwich structure with an alpha/beta plait topology.

== TFIIH ==
Transcription/repair factor IIH (TFIIH) is essential for RNA polymerase II transcription and nucleotide excision repair. The TFIIH complex consists of ten subunits:

- ERCC2,
- ERCC3,
- GTF2H1,
- GTF2H2,
- GTF2H3,
- GTF2H4,
- GTF2H5,
- MNAT1,
- CDK7 and
- CCNH.

TTDA is also required for the stability of the TFIIH complex and for the presence of normal levels of TFIIH in the cell. TFIIH is one of five general transcription factors (GTFs) that assemble with RNA polymerase IIat a promoter site prior to the initiation of transcription. It is one of ten subunits that complete part of the 10 subunit protein complex (holoTFIIH) and part of a six-subunit complex of Rad3, Tfb1, Tfb2, Tfb4, Tfb5, and Ssl1 (referred to as core)

== Function ==
In humans, the function of Tbf5 is clear, as loss of it leads to trichothiosystropy. Defects in GTF2H5 cause the disease trichothiodystrophy (TTD), therefore GTF2H5 (general transcription factor 2H subunit 5) is also known as the TTD group A (TTDA) subunit (and as Tfb5). The TTDA subunit is responsible for the DNA repair function of the complex. TTDA is present both bound to TFIIH, and as a free fraction that shuffles between the cytoplasm and nucleus; induction of NER-type DNA lesions shifts the balance towards TTDA's more stable association with TFIIH.

REX1, which is short for, required for excision 1, is required for DNA repair in the single-celled, photosynthetic algae Chlamydomonas reinhardtii, and has homologues in other eukaryotes.
