= CDK-activating kinase =

Cyclin binding alone causes partial activation of Cdks, but complete activation also requires activating phosphorylation by CAK. In animal cells, CAK phosphorylates the Cdk subunit only after cyclin binding, and so the two steps in Cdk activation are usually ordered as shown here, with cyclin binding occurring first. Budding yeast contains a different version of CAK that can phosphorylate the Cdk even in the absence of cyclin, and so the two activation steps can occur in either order. In all cases, CAK tends to be in constant excess in the cell, so that cyclin binding is the rate-limiting step in Cdk activation.

CDK-activating kinase (CAK) activates the cyclin-CDK complex by phosphorylating threonine residue 160 in the CDK activation loop. CAK itself is a member of the Cdk family and functions as a positive regulator of Cdk1, Cdk2, Cdk4, and Cdk6.

== Catalytic activity ==
Cdk activation requires two steps. First, cyclin must bind to the Cdk. In the second step, CAK must phosphorylate the cyclin-Cdk complex on the threonine residue 160, which is located in the Cdk activation segment. Since Cdks need to be free of Cdk inhibitor proteins (CKIs) and associated with cyclins in order to be activated, CAK activity is considered to be indirectly regulated by cyclins.

Phosphorylation is generally considered a reversible modification used to change enzyme activity in different conditions. However, activating phosphorylation of Cdk by CAK appears to be an exception to this trend. In fact, CAK activity remains high throughout the cell cycle and is not regulated by any known cell-cycle control mechanism. However compared to normal cells, CAK activity is reduced in quiescent G0 cells and slightly elevated in tumor cells.

In mammals, activating phosphorylation by CAK can only occur once cyclin is bound. In budding yeast, activating phosphorylation by CAK can take place before cyclin binding. In both humans and yeast, cyclin binding is the rate limiting step in the activation of Cdk. Therefore, phosphorylation of Cdk by CAK is considered a post-translational modification that is necessary for enzyme activity. Although activating phosphorylation by CAK is not exploited for cell-cycle regulation purposes, it is a highly conserved process because CAK also regulates transcription.

== Orthologs ==
In animals (for example, H. sapiens, left), a trimeric CAK enzyme containing Cdk7 functions both in the activation of Cdks and in the regulation of transcription by RNA polymerase II. In the budding yeast S. cerevisiae (right) the homologous enzyme, Kin28, does not contribute to Cdk activation but is focused entirely on control of transcription. In this species, an unrelated protein kinase, Cak1, activates Cdks. The fission yeast S. pombe (center) occupies an intermediate position, in which Cdk activation can be achieved both by the Cdk7 homolog Mcs6 and by a Cak1 homolog, Csk1. Cdk7, Kin28 and Mcs6 are all Cdks whose activities are also enhanced by phosphorylation of residues in their T-loops. In budding and fission yeasts, this phosphorylation is carried out by Cak1 and Csk1, respectively. The kinase that phosphorylates Cdk7 in animals is not clear.

CAK varies dramatically in different species. In vertebrates and Drosophila, CAK is a trimeric protein complex consisting of Cdk7 (a Cdk-related protein kinase), cyclin H, and Mat1. The Cdk7 subunit is responsible for Cdk activation while the Mat1 subunit is responsible for transcription. The CAK trimer can be phosphorylated on the activation segment of Cdk7 subunit. However, unlike other Cdks, this phosphorylation is might not be essential for CAK activity. In the presence of Mat1, activation of CAK does not require phosphorylation of the activation segment. However, in the absence of Mat1, phosphorylation of the activation segment is required for CAK activity.

In vertebrates, CAK localizes to the nucleus. This suggests that CAK is not only involved in cell-cycle regulation but is also involved in transcription. In fact, the Cdk7 subunit of vertebrate CAK phosphorylates several components of the transcriptional machinery.

In budding yeast, CAK is a monomeric protein kinase and is referred to as Cak1. Cak1 is distantly homologous to Cdks. Cak1 localizes to the cytoplasm and is responsible for Cdk activation. Budding yeast Cdk7 homolog, Kin28, does not have CAK activity.

Fission yeasts have two CAKs with both overlapping and specialized functions. The first CAK is a complex of Msc6 and Msc2. The Msc6 and Msc2 complex is related to the vertebrate Cdk7-cyclinH complex. Msc6 and Msc2 complex not only activates cell cycle Cdks but also regulates gene expression because it is part of the transcription factor TFIIH. The second fission yeast CAK, Csk1, is an ortholog of budding yeast Cak1. Csk1 can activate Cdks but is not essential for Cdk activity.

Table of Cdk-activating Kinases
http://www.oup.com/uk/orc/bin/9780199206100/resources/figures/nsp-cellcycle-3-3-3_7.jpg.
Credit to: Oxford University Press "Morgan: The Cell Cycle"

Cdkactivation
http://www.oup.com/uk/orc/bin/9780199206100/resources/figures/nsp-cellcycle-3-3-3_8.jpg
Credit to: Oxford University Press "Morgan: The Cell Cycle"

== Structure ==
The conformation of the Cdk2 active site changes dramatically upon cyclin binding and CAK phosphorylation. The active site of Cdk2 lies in a cleft between the two lobes of the kinase. ATP binds deep within the cleft and its phosphate is oriented outwards. Protein substrates bind to the entrance of the active site cleft.

In its inactive form, Cdk2 cannot bind substrate because the entrance of its active site is blocked by the T-loop. Inactive Cdk2 also has a misoriented ATP binding site. When Cdk2 is inactive, the small L12 helix pushes the large PSTAIRE helix outwards. The PSTAIRE helix contains a residue, glutamate 51, that is important for positioning the ATP phosphates.

When cyclinA binds, several conformational changes take place. The T-loop moves out of active site entrance and no longer blocks the substrate binding site. The PSTAIRE helix moves in. The L12 helix becomes a beta strand. This allows glutamate 51 to interact with lysine 33. Aspartate 145 also changes position. Together these structural changes allow ATP phosphates to bind correctly.

When CAK phosphorylates Cdk's threonine residue160, the T-loop flattens and interacts more closely with cyclin A. Phosphorylation also allows the Cdk to interact more effectively with substrates that contain the SPXK sequence. Phosphorylation also increases the activity of cyclinA-Cdk2 complex. Different cyclins produce different conformation changes in Cdk.

Image Link - Structural Basis of Cdk Activation
http://www.oup.com/uk/orc/bin/9780199206100/resources/figures/nsp-cellcycle-3-4-3_12.jpg
Credit to: Oxford University Press "Morgan: The Cell Cycle"

== Additional functions ==
In addition to activating Cdks, CAK also regulates transcription. Two forms of CAK have been identified: free CAK and TFIIH-associated CAK. Free CAK is more abundant than TFIIH-associated CAK. Free CAK phosphorylates Cdks and is involved in cell cycle regulation. Associated CAK is part of the general transcription factor TFIIH. CAK associated with TFIIH phosphorylates proteins involved in transcription including RNA polymerase II. More specifically, associated CAK is involved in promoter clearance and progression of transcription from the preinitiation to the initiation stage.

In vertebrates, the trimeric CAK complex is responsible for transcription regulation. In budding yeast, the Cdk7 homolog, Kin28, regulates transcription. In fission yeast, the Msc6 Msc2 complex controls basal gene transcription.

In addition to regulating transcription, CAK also enhances transcription by phosphorylating retinoic acid and estrogen receptors. Phosphorylation of these receptors leads to increased expression of target genes. In leukemic cells, where DNA is damaged, CAK’s ability to phosphorylate retinoic acid and estrogen receptors is decreased. Decreased CAK activity creates a feedback loop, which turns off TFIIH activity.

CAK also plays a role in DNA damage response. The activity of CAK associated with TFIIH decreases when DNA is damaged by UV irradiation. Inhibition of CAK prevents cell cycle from progressing. This mechanism ensures the fidelity of chromosome transmission.
