= MPLKIP =

Protein-coding gene in the species Homo sapiens

Identifiers
- Aliases: MPLKIP, ABHS, C7orf11, ORF20, TTD4, M-phase specific PLK1 interacting protein
- External IDs: OMIM: 609188; MGI: 1913558; HomoloGene: 32633; GeneCards: MPLKIP; OMA:MPLKIP - orthologs

Gene location (Human)
Chr.	Chromosome 7 (human)
Band	7p14.1	Start	40,126,027 bp
Band	7p14.1	End	40,134,622 bp

Gene location (Mouse)
Chr.	Chromosome 13 (mouse)
Band	13|13 A2	Start	17,869,777 bp
Band	13|13 A2	End	17,874,333 bp
RNA expression pattern
Bgee	Human / Mouse (ortholog); Top expressed in: skin of arm; superior surface of tongue; renal medulla; mucosa of ileum; thymus; pericardium; mucosa of pharynx; buccal mucosa cell; body of tongue; mucosa of sigmoid colon / Top expressed in: ventricular zone; spermatocyte; yolk sac; granulocyte; embryo; right kidney; epiblast; embryo; thymus; proximal tubule; More reference expression data
BioGPS	n/a
Gene ontology
Molecular function	protein binding
Cellular component	cytoplasm; microtubule organizing center; centrosome; Golgi apparatus; midbody; cytoskeleton; nucleus; nucleoplasm; intracellular membrane-bounded organelle
Biological process	cell cycle; cell division
Sources:Amigo / QuickGO
Orthologs
Species	Human	Mouse
Entrez	136647	66308
Ensembl	ENSG00000168303	ENSMUSG00000012429
UniProt	Q8TAP9	Q9D011
RefSeq (mRNA)	NM_138701	NM_025479
RefSeq (protein)	NP_619646	NP_079755
Location (UCSC)	Chr 7: 40.13 – 40.13 Mb	Chr 13: 17.87 – 17.87 Mb
PubMed search
- Wikidata
View/Edit Human	View/Edit Mouse

M-phase-specific PLK1-interacting protein (TTD non-photosensitive 1 protein) is a protein that in humans is encoded by the MPLKIP gene (previously known as C7orf11). Patients with an inherited defect in both alleles of the gene suffer from trichothiodystrophy (TTD), a disease hallmarked by brittle hair and nails and usually by developmental difficulties as well. One patient carries a homozygous deletion of the whole gene area, which indicates that the gene is not essential for embryonic development. TTD can be diagnosed by the presence of tigertail-striped patterns in hair visible under polarised light microscopy, or biochemically by a reduced Cys content of the hairs. Only a minority of the TTD cases carry a MPLKIP defect: more frequently, the gene ERCC2 is mutated, which encodes a subunit of the protein complex TFIIH that is required for general transcription and for nucleotide excision repair of DNA damage.
