= XPD (disambiguation) =

XPD can mean multiple things:

- XPD, a spy novel by Len Deighton
- the ISO 4217 code for the value of one troy ounce of palladium
- XPD, a name for the ERCC2 protein
- xpd, the ISO 639-3 code for the Paredarerme language
