= ERCC =

ERCC may refer to:

- East Riding County Council, Yorkshire, England
- Early Rain Covenant Church, Chengdu, Sichuan, China, a Presbyterian church
- Edinburgh Rape Crisis Centre, Scotland, a charity
- Directorate-General for European Civil Protection and Humanitarian Aid Operations § Emergency Response Coordination Centre (ERCC)
- European Rugby Champions Cup, Europe's top rugby union club competition
  - European Rugby Challenge Cup, the second tier competition
- Evangelical Reformed Church of Christ, Nigeria
- Excision repair cross-complementing, including a list of ERCC genes
- External RNA Controls Consortium; see Epitranscriptomic sequencing
