= GTF2H2 =

Protein-coding gene in the species Homo sapiens

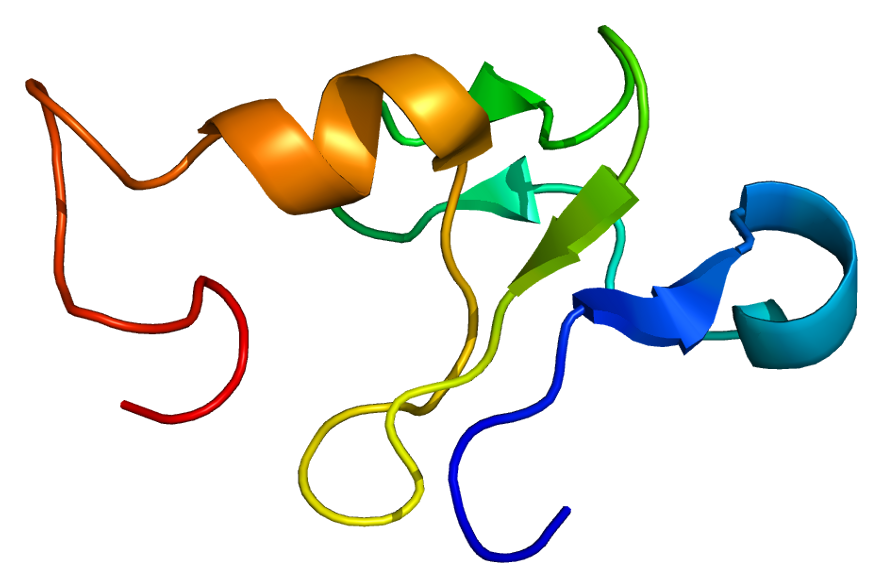

Identifiers
- Aliases: GTF2H2, BTF2, BTF2P44, T-BTF2P44, TFIIH, p44, general transcription factor IIH subunit 2
- External IDs: OMIM: 601748; MGI: 1345669; GeneCards: GTF2H2
Available structures
PDB	Ortholog search: PDBe RCSB
PDB	List of PDB id codes 1Z60, 5IVW, 5IY9, 5IY8, 5IY7, 5IY6

Gene location (Human)
Chr.	Chromosome 5 (human)
Band	5q13.2	Start	71,032,670 bp
Band	5q13.2	End	71,067,689 bp

Gene location (Mouse)
Chr.	Chromosome 13 (mouse)
Band	13 D1|13 53.21 cM	Start	100,596,726 bp
Band	13 D1|13 53.21 cM	End	100,629,087 bp
RNA expression pattern
Bgee	Human / Mouse (ortholog); Top expressed in: endometrium; sural nerve; corpus callosum; gonad; Achilles tendon; islet of Langerhans; monocyte; testicle; mucosa of transverse colon; smooth muscle tissue / Top expressed in: tail of embryo; zygote; morula; genital tubercle; neural layer of retina; ventricular zone; right kidney; embryo; embryo; yolk sac; More reference expression data
BioGPS	n/a
Gene ontology
Molecular function	protein kinase activity; ATP-dependent activity, acting on DNA; protein N-terminus binding; DNA-binding transcription factor activity; zinc ion binding; translation factor activity, RNA binding; metal ion binding; protein binding; RNA polymerase II CTD heptapeptide repeat kinase activity; nucleic acid binding; RNA polymerase II general transcription initiation factor activity
Cellular component	nucleoplasm; transcription factor TFIIH holo complex; transcription factor TFIIH core complex; core TFIIH complex portion of holo TFIIH complex; nucleus; transcription factor TFIID complex; nuclear speck
Biological process	termination of RNA polymerase I transcription; G protein-coupled receptor internalization; regulation of transcription, DNA-templated; transcription initiation from RNA polymerase I promoter; transcription elongation from RNA polymerase II promoter; 7-methylguanosine mRNA capping; transcription by RNA polymerase II; transcription, DNA-templated; cellular response to DNA damage stimulus; global genome nucleotide-excision repair; transcription-coupled nucleotide-excision repair; transcription initiation from RNA polymerase II promoter; nucleotide-excision repair, DNA incision; response to UV; nucleotide-excision repair, preincision complex assembly; DNA repair; protein biosynthesis; nucleotide-excision repair, DNA incision, 5'-to lesion; nucleotide-excision repair, preincision complex stabilization; protein phosphorylation; nucleotide-excision repair; regulation of transcription by RNA polymerase II; positive regulation of DNA helicase activity; nucleotide-excision repair, DNA duplex unwinding; nucleotide-excision repair, DNA incision, 3'-to lesion; transcription elongation from RNA polymerase I promoter
Sources:Amigo / QuickGO
Orthologs
Databases	NCBI: entry; OMA: entry
Species	Human	Mouse
Entrez	2966	23894
Ensembl	ENSG00000145736; ENSG00000276910; ENSG00000275045	ENSMUSG00000021639
UniProt	Q13888	Q9JIB4
RefSeq (mRNA)	NM_001515	NM_022011; NM_001360706
RefSeq (protein)	NP_001506; NP_001351496; NP_001351497; NP_001351498; NP_001351499 NP_001351500; NP_001351501; NP_001351502	NP_071294; NP_001347635
Location (UCSC)	Chr 5: 71.03 – 71.07 Mb	Chr 13: 100.6 – 100.63 Mb
PubMed search
- Wikidata
View/Edit Human	View/Edit Mouse

General transcription factor IIH subunit 2 is a protein that in humans is encoded by the GTF2H2 gene.

== Function ==
This gene is part of a 500 kb inverted duplication on chromosome 5q13. This duplicated region contains at least four genes and repetitive elements which make it prone to rearrangements and deletions. The repetitiveness and complexity of the sequence have also caused difficulty in determining the organization of this genomic region. This gene is within the telomeric copy of the duplication. Deletion of this gene sometimes accompanies deletion of the neighboring SMN1 gene in spinal muscular atrophy (SMA) patients but it is unclear if deletion of this gene contributes to the SMA phenotype. This gene encodes the 44 kDa subunit of RNA polymerase II transcription initiation factor IIH which is involved in basal transcription and nucleotide excision repair. Transcript variants for this gene have been described, but their full length nature has not been determined. A second copy of this gene within the centromeric copy of the duplication has been described in the literature. It is reported to be different by either two or four base pairs; however, no sequence data is currently available for the centromeric copy of the gene.

== Interactions ==
GTF2H2 has been shown to interact with GTF2H5, XPB and ERCC2.

== See also ==
- Transcription Factor II H
