= Hair defect-photosensitivity-intellectual disability syndrome =

Hair defeft-photosensitivity-intellectual disability syndrome
- Specialty: Medical genetics
- Symptoms: fragile, stubby hair, photosensitive eyebrows and eyelashes and intellectual disabilities

Hair defect-photosensitivity-intellectual disability, also known as Calderon-Gonzalez-Cantu syndrome, is a rare syndrome characterized by fragile hair, photosensitive eyebrows and eyelashes and intellectual disability which does not progress, and no metabolic aberration. Only three sisters that were born to consanguineous parents have been described in medical literature.

== See also ==
- Trichothiodystrophy, a more common set of syndromes with which this might be confused
