= RNF113A =

Identifiers
- Aliases: RNF113A, Cwc24, RNF113, ZNF183, TTD5, ring finger protein 113A
- External IDs: OMIM: 300951; MGI: 1913631; GeneCards: RNF113A
Enzyme activity
EC #	BRENDA	ExPASy	KEGG	MetaCyc
2.3.2.27	↗	↗	↗	↗

Gene location (Human)
Chr.	X chromosome (human)
Band	Xq24	Start	119,870,475 bp
Band	Xq24	End	119,871,733 bp

Gene location (Mouse)
Chr.	Chromosome 12 (mouse)
Band	12|12 D1	Start	84,463,970 bp
Band	12|12 D1	End	84,465,352 bp
RNA expression pattern
Bgee	Human / Mouse (ortholog); Top expressed in: granulocyte; monocyte; tendon of biceps brachii; parotid gland; blood; spleen; body of pancreas; mucosa of transverse colon; testicle; olfactory zone of nasal mucosa / Top expressed in: zygote; secondary oocyte; interventricular septum; neural layer of retina; spermatid; supraoptic nucleus; granulocyte; Paneth cell; primary oocyte; otic vesicle; More reference expression data
BioGPS	n/a
Gene ontology
Molecular function	metal ion binding; protein binding; ubiquitin-protein transferase activity; transferase activity
Cellular component	U2-type spliceosomal complex; nucleus; spliceosomal complex; nuclear speck; U2-type precatalytic spliceosome
Biological process	mRNA cis splicing, via spliceosome; snoRNA splicing; protein ubiquitination; isopeptide cross-linking via N6-glycyl-L-lysine; negative regulation of chemokine-mediated signaling pathway; DNA repair; mRNA processing; cellular response to DNA damage stimulus; RNA splicing; mRNA splicing, via spliceosome
Sources:Amigo / QuickGO
Orthologs
Databases	NCBI: entry; OMA: entry
Species	Human	Mouse
Entrez	7737	66381
Ensembl	ENSG00000125352	ENSMUSG00000098134
UniProt	O15541	n/a
RefSeq (mRNA)	NM_006978	NM_025525
RefSeq (protein)	NP_008909	n/a
Location (UCSC)	Chr X: 119.87 – 119.87 Mb	Chr 12: 84.46 – 84.47 Mb
PubMed search
- Wikidata
View/Edit Human	View/Edit Mouse

Ring Finger Protein 113A is a protein that in humans is encoded by the RNF113A gene. It is found in humans on the X Chromosome. RNF113A contains two highly conserved domains, the RING (Really Interesting New Gene) finger domain and Zinc finger domain. RING finger domains have been associated with some tumor suppressors and cytokine receptor-associated molecules. These domains also act in DNA repair and mediating protein-protein interactions. Aliases of RNF113A across taxa include RNF113, CWC24, and ZNF183.

== Gene ==
The gene is found on the human X Chromosome and reverse strand. The specific locus in humans is Xq24. RNF113A contains 1312 nucleotides.

The red bar in white band q24 represents the location of the gene RFN113A on the human X chromosome.

=== Gene Structure ===
An upstream in-frame stop codon is found within the 5' UTR. RNF113A is an intronless gene with one isoform in humans.

== Protein ==
RNF113A translates a human protein 343 amino acids long and molecular weight of 38.8 kilodaltons. The protein is found ubiquitously in the human body.

Yeast Two Hybrid Screens link RNF113A with other proteins. Most of these proteins are currently known to function in the human Spliceosome. Some of these associations are within the U4, U5, and U6 snRNPs much the same as within yeast models.

=== Protein Structure ===
RNF113A also contains one acetylation and four phosphorylation sites. The protein has both an acetylation and four phosphorylation sites which have been confirmed experimentally. Additional phosphorylation sites and one glycosylation site are also predicted. The N terminus or 3' end of the gene contains the conserved RING and Zinc finger domains. The RING finger domain contains a cross-brace motif consisting of 6 Cystines and 1 Histidine.The Zinc finger is formed by 3 Cystines and 1 Histidine Typically, RING finger domains are located near the C terminus or 5' end of the protein rather than the N terminus making RNF113A unique. RING finger proteins also usually have multiple types of domains outside of the Zinc finger family.

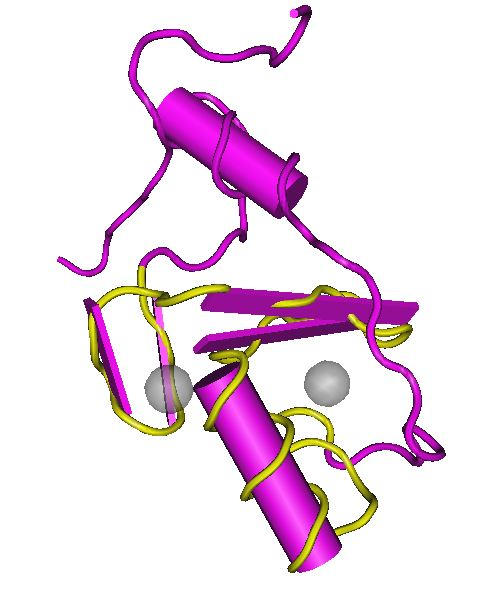
The C-terminus end of the early isolated paralog RNF113B, formerly known as Zing Finger Protein 183-like 1, contains the RING domain in yellow to the C-terminus. The known alpha-helices and beta-sheets are visible. The two grey spheres represent zinc atoms.

Secondary structure of the RING domain has been confirmed for the paralog, RNF113B. Two Beta sheets and one Alpha helix are present within the domain. A second Alpha helix is present on the 5' side of the RING domain.

== Function ==
=== Human ===
The RNF113A protein was identified as a phosphoprotein in a human prostate cancer cell line but the function was not tested. Online Mendelian Inheritance in Man (OMIM) links mutation of RNF113A with trichothiodystrophy 5, nonphotosensitive. One case study reported a nonsense mutation resulting from changing a cytosine to a thymidine in RNF113A that causes X-linked recessive trichothiodystrophy. Mothers are the carriers for the disease and display only slightly altered phenotypes that were linked to the mutation compared to their more severely affected sons. Myelodysplastic syndrome and 5q-syndrome have also been linked to an upregulation of ZNF183, an alias of RNF113A. It appears RNF113A may allow for a more stable activated spliceosome and post-catalytic spliceosome.

=== Yeast ===
The yeast ortholog Cwc24p is predicted to have a spliceosome function. The protein acts in a complex with Cef1p to process pre-rRNA. The splicing is dependent on the Zinc finger and RING finger domains.

=== Drosophila ===
The ortholog in fruit flies has been suggested to act as a spliceosome. Based on the observed phenotype of incomplete neuroblast differentiation, the ortholog is hypothesized to be involved in splicing namely within the central nervous system. Additional research conclude a cytosine to thymidine nonsense mutation such as that of trichothiodystrophy discussed above has resulted in abnormal development in which tissues of the ectoderm germ layer are affected.

=== Nematodes ===
The Caenorhabditis elegans Tag-331 ortholog has been linked to larval arrest and legality when a knock-out is created The RNF-113 ortholog has been predicted to function as an ubiquitin ligase that is involved in DNA repair of inter-strand crosslinks

== Paralog ==
RNF113B is the primate-specific retrogene of RNF113A. The gene is a rare example of intron gain into a gene. In humans, RNF113B is found on Chromosome 13. RNF113B mRNA transcript contains an upstream in-frame stop codon. The protein has both a RING finger domain (really interesting new gene) and a zinc finger motif.

RNF113B currently is not associated with any human diseases according to the Online Mendelian Inheritance in Man (OMIM) database. Preliminary research has suggested the gene to be linked to development and differentiation. RNF113B has also been predicted to be a part of the ubiquitin ligase family and involved with DNA repair mechanisms after treatment with cisplatin, a chemotherapy drug that induces DNA inter-strand crosslinks. Further research indicates RNF113B is transcribed in a wide assortment of tissues. The transcripts can be spliced or unspliced and this action is specific to the tissue of expression. However, the mechanisms and functions of this gene specially in these tissues are still unknown.

== Homology ==
Orthologs have been found in mammals, birds, reptiles, amphibians, fish, and invertebrates. Distant orthologs have been recognized in fungi, yeast, and plants. The zinc finger domain and RING finger domain are the regions of highest conservation. The upstream region displays the most conservation in mammals.

Scientific name	Common name	E value	Query cover	Identity	Accession	Protein length	Taxa	Divergence (myr)
Macaca mulatta	Rhesus monkey	0	1.00	0.98	NP_001185630.1	344	Mammal	26.8
Equus caballus	Horse	0	1.00	0.93	XP_001491864.1	344	Mammal	96.2
Chrymsemys picta bellii	Western painted turtle	0	0.94	0.80	XP_005309675.1	323	Reptile	322.4
Gallus gallus	Chicken	9E-177	0.93	0.77	NP_001004396.1	328	Bird	322.4
Xenopus laevis	African clawed frog	5E-157	0.90	0.71	AAR97523.1	319	Amphibian	359.1
Danio rerio	Zebrafish	5E-160	0.98	0.71	NP_001004536.1	321	Fish	436.8
Echinococcus multilocularis	Flatworm	2E-100	0.90	0.5	CDI98689.1	389	Flatworm	625
Apis florea	Little honeybee	2E-130	0.88	0.62	XP_003695009.1	325	Insect	725.5
Ciona intestinalis	Vase Tunicate	2E-127	0.92	0.61	NP_001027830.1	325	Tunicate	763.5
Saccharomyces cerevisiae	Fungus	4E-40	0.59	0.44	NP_013427.1	259	Yeast	1211
Amorella trichopoda	Shrub	4E-62	0.92	0.40	XP_006842511.1	322	Plant	1375

The table above displays the results of an NCBI Blast from 2015 with selected taxa from main branches of vertebrates and invertebrates. This is not a complete list.
