= GTF2H5 =

Protein-coding gene in the species Homo sapiens

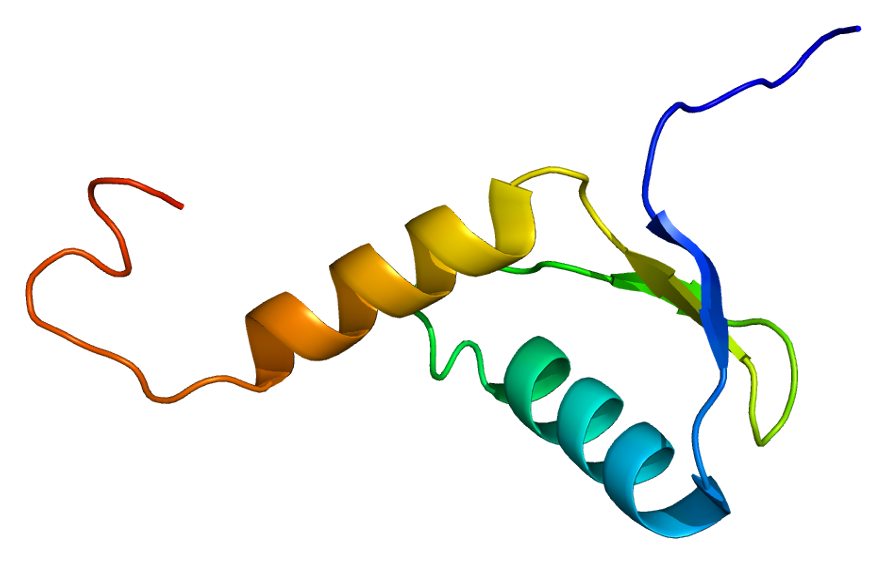

Identifiers
- Aliases: GTF2H5, C6orf175, TFB5, TFIIH, TGF2H5, TTD, TTD-A, TTDA, bA120J8.2, TTD3, general transcription factor IIH subunit 5
- External IDs: OMIM: 608780; MGI: 107227; GeneCards: GTF2H5
Available structures
PDB	Ortholog search: PDBe RCSB
PDB	List of PDB id codes 1YDL, 2JNJ, 5IY8, 5IY6, 5IY7, 5IVW, 5IY9

Gene location (Human)
Chr.	Chromosome 6 (human)
Band	6q25.3	Start	158,168,350 bp
Band	6q25.3	End	158,199,344 bp

Gene location (Mouse)
Chr.	Chromosome 17 (mouse)
Band	17 A1|17 3.7 cM	Start	6,130,061 bp
Band	17 A1|17 3.7 cM	End	6,136,792 bp
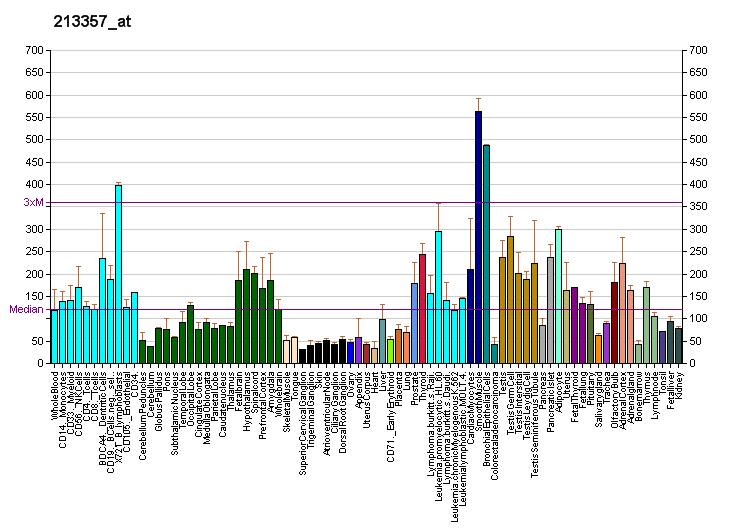
RNA expression pattern
Bgee	Human / Mouse (ortholog); Top expressed in: renal medulla; superior surface of tongue; saphenous vein; vena cava; pericardium; trigeminal ganglion; mucosa of pharynx; pons; body of tongue; external globus pallidus / Top expressed in: hand; endocardial cushion; morula; otic vesicle; otolith organ; hair follicle; utricle; atrioventricular valve; medial ganglionic eminence; abdominal wall; More reference expression data
BioGPS	More reference expression data
Gene ontology
Molecular function	rDNA binding; protein binding
Cellular component	nucleoplasm; nucleolus; transcription factor TFIIH core complex; nucleus; transcription factor TFIID complex; transcription factor TFIIH holo complex
Biological process	termination of RNA polymerase I transcription; regulation of transcription, DNA-templated; transcription initiation from RNA polymerase I promoter; transcription elongation from RNA polymerase II promoter; 7-methylguanosine mRNA capping; transcription by RNA polymerase II; transcription, DNA-templated; cellular response to DNA damage stimulus; global genome nucleotide-excision repair; cellular response to gamma radiation; rRNA processing; transcription-coupled nucleotide-excision repair; transcription initiation from RNA polymerase II promoter; nucleotide-excision repair, DNA incision; nucleotide-excision repair, preincision complex assembly; nucleotide-excision repair; nucleotide-excision repair, DNA incision, 5'-to lesion; DNA repair; nucleotide-excision repair, preincision complex stabilization; transcription elongation from RNA polymerase I promoter; phosphorylation of RNA polymerase II C-terminal domain; nucleotide-excision repair, DNA duplex unwinding; nucleotide-excision repair, DNA incision, 3'-to lesion
Sources:Amigo / QuickGO
Orthologs
Databases	NCBI: entry; OMA: entry
Species	Human	Mouse
Entrez	404672	66467
Ensembl	ENSG00000272047	ENSMUSG00000034345
UniProt	Q6ZYL4	Q8K2X8
RefSeq (mRNA)	NM_207118	NM_181392; NM_001357804
RefSeq (protein)	NP_997001	NP_852057; NP_001344733
Location (UCSC)	Chr 6: 158.17 – 158.2 Mb	Chr 17: 6.13 – 6.14 Mb
PubMed search
- Wikidata
View/Edit Human	View/Edit Mouse

General transcription factor IIH subunit 5 is a protein that in humans is encoded by the GTF2H5 gene.

== Function ==
The GTF2H5(TTDA) gene encodes a small (71 amino acid) protein that stabilizes the multi-subunit transcription repair factor IIH(TFIIH). TFIIH plays a key role in a major DNA repair process, nucleotide excision repair (NER), by opening the DNA double helix after the initial recognition of damage in one strand. This step is followed by excision of the damaged region to generate a single-strand gap, and then repair synthesis, using the undamaged strand as template, to accurately fill in the gap. Disruption of the GTF2H5(TTDA) gene in a knockout mouse-model completely inactivates NER. In humans, mutation in any one of four genes can give rise to the trichothiodystrophy phenotype. These genes are TTDN1, XPB, XPD and GTF2H5(TTDA).

== Interactions ==
GTF2H5 has been shown to interact with GTF2H2 and XPB.
