= TCEA1 =

Human protein-coding gene

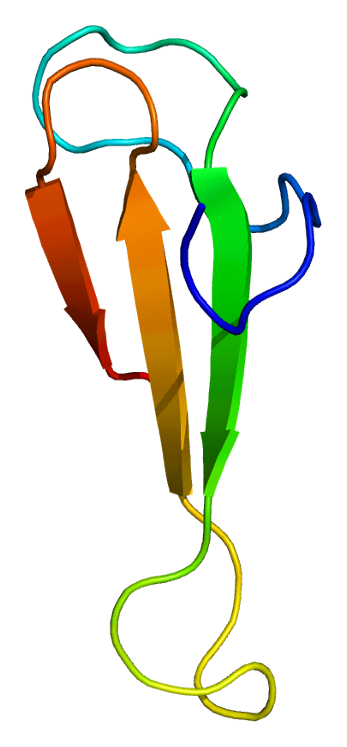

Identifiers
- Aliases: TCEA1, GTF2S, SII, TCEA, TF2S, TFIIS, transcription elongation factor A1
- External IDs: OMIM: 601425; MGI: 1196624; GeneCards: TCEA1
Available structures
PDB	Ortholog search: PDBe RCSB
PDB	List of PDB id codes 1TFI, 3NDQ, 5IY7, 5IYA, 5IY6, 5IYB, 5IY8, 5IYC

Gene location (Human)
Chr.	Chromosome 8 (human)
Band	8q11.23	Start	53,966,552 bp
Band	8q11.23	End	54,022,456 bp

Gene location (Mouse)
Chr.	Chromosome 1 (mouse)
Band	1|1 A1	Start	4,928,037 bp
Band	1|1 A1	End	4,968,132 bp
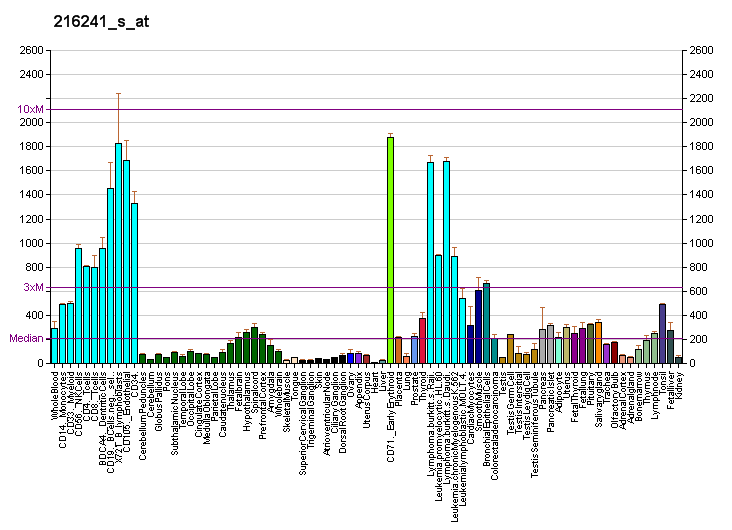
RNA expression pattern
Bgee	Human / Mouse (ortholog); Top expressed in: trabecular bone; Achilles tendon; optic nerve; caput epididymis; cartilage tissue; tail of epididymis; corpus epididymis; skin of thigh; parotid gland; lactiferous duct / Top expressed in: zygote; fetal liver hematopoietic progenitor cell; tail of embryo; secondary oocyte; medial ganglionic eminence; parotid gland; lacrimal gland; hand; calvaria; human fetus; More reference expression data
BioGPS	More reference expression data
Gene ontology
Molecular function	DNA binding; zinc ion binding; protein binding; metal ion binding; nucleic acid binding
Cellular component	nucleolus; nucleus; nucleoplasm; transcription factor TFIID complex
Biological process	transcription elongation from RNA polymerase II promoter; transcription-coupled nucleotide-excision repair; regulation of transcription, DNA-templated; transcription by RNA polymerase II; transcription, DNA-templated; positive regulation of exoribonuclease activity; positive regulation of transcription by RNA polymerase II
Sources:Amigo / QuickGO
Orthologs
Databases	NCBI: entry; OMA: entry
Species	Human	Mouse
Entrez	6917	21399
Ensembl	ENSG00000187735	ENSMUSG00000033813
UniProt	P23193	P10711
RefSeq (mRNA)	NM_006756; NM_201437	NM_001159750; NM_001159751; NM_011541
RefSeq (protein)	NP_006747; NP_958845	NP_001153222; NP_001153223; NP_035671
Location (UCSC)	Chr 8: 53.97 – 54.02 Mb	Chr 1: 4.93 – 4.97 Mb
PubMed search
- Wikidata
View/Edit Human	View/Edit Mouse

Transcription elongation factor A protein 1 is a protein that in humans is encoded by the TCEA1 gene.

In other organisms, this gene is better known as transcription elongation factor II S (TFIIS). It mainly helps to resolve backtracked elongation complexes by inducing a cut in the RNAP active site, so reaction becomes possible again. It is also found in the eukaryotic transcription preinitiation complex. A homolog in archaea performs the same main task, while bacteria use the non-homologous Gre.

== Interactions ==
TCEA1 has been shown to interact with GTF2H1 and POLR2A.
