= Alanine–tRNA ligase, cytoplasmic =

Enzyme found in humans, implicated in neuropathy

AARS1
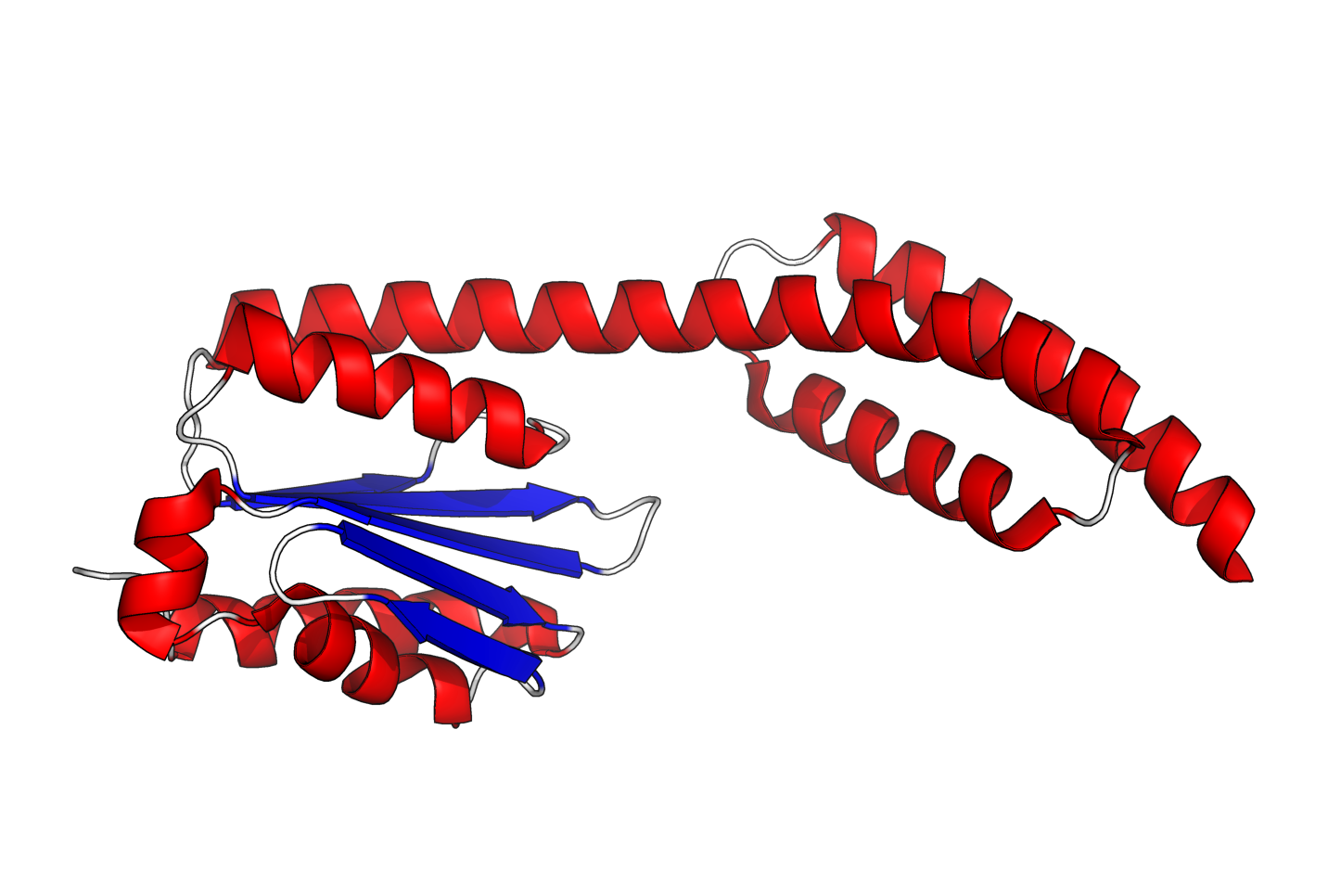

Identifiers
- Aliases: AARS1, CMT2N, EIEE29, alanyl-tRNA synthetase, AARS, alanyl-tRNA synthetase 1, DEE29, TTD8, HDLS2
- External IDs: OMIM: 601065; MGI: 2384560; GeneCards: AARS1
Available structures
PDB	Ortholog search: PDBe RCSB
PDB	List of PDB id codes 4XEO, 4XEM
Enzyme activity
EC #	BRENDA	ExPASy	KEGG	MetaCyc
6.1.1.7	↗	↗	↗	↗

Gene location (Human)
Chr.	Chromosome 16 (human)
Band	16q22.1	Start	70,251,983 bp
Band	16q22.1	End	70,289,707 bp

Gene location (Mouse)
Chr.	Chromosome 8 (mouse)
Band	8|8 E1	Start	111,759,776 bp
Band	8|8 E1	End	111,784,296 bp
RNA expression pattern
Bgee	Human / Mouse (ortholog); Top expressed in: beta cell; frontal pole; Brodmann area 10; right frontal lobe; middle frontal gyrus; paraflocculus of cerebellum; Brodmann area 9; stromal cell of endometrium; cingulate gyrus; cerebellar vermis / Top expressed in: calvaria; left lobe of liver; facial motor nucleus; lacrimal gland; stroma of bone marrow; anterior horn of spinal cord; endothelial cell of lymphatic vessel; somite; primitive streak; crypt of lieberkuhn of small intestine; More reference expression data
BioGPS	n/a
Gene ontology
Molecular function	aminoacyl-tRNA ligase activity; nucleotide binding; amino acid binding; metal ion binding; ligase activity; RNA binding; nucleic acid binding; ATP binding; tRNA binding; alanine-tRNA ligase activity; aminoacyl-tRNA editing activity; Ser-tRNA(Ala) hydrolase activity; zinc ion binding; translation regulator activity
Cellular component	membrane; mitochondrion; extracellular exosome; cytoplasm; cytosol
Biological process	negative regulation of neuron apoptotic process; tRNA aminoacylation; protein biosynthesis; neuromuscular process controlling balance; tRNA processing; tRNA aminoacylation for protein translation; tRNA modification; neuromuscular process; cerebellar Purkinje cell layer development; regulation of translational fidelity; alanyl-tRNA aminoacylation; aminoacyl-tRNA metabolism involved in translational fidelity; regulation of cytoplasmic translational fidelity
Sources:Amigo / QuickGO
Orthologs
Databases	NCBI: entry; OMA: entry
Species	Human	Mouse
Entrez	16	234734
Ensembl	ENSG00000090861	ENSMUSG00000031960
UniProt	P49588	Q8BGQ7
RefSeq (mRNA)	NM_001605	NM_146217
RefSeq (protein)	NP_001596	NP_666329
Location (UCSC)	Chr 16: 70.25 – 70.29 Mb	Chr 8: 111.76 – 111.78 Mb
PubMed search
- Wikidata
View/Edit Human	View/Edit Mouse

Alanine–tRNA ligase, cytoplasmic, also called Alanyl-tRNA synthetase 1 (AARS1), is an enzyme that is encoded by the AARS1 gene in humans and is a member of the Alanine–tRNA ligase (ARSs) family of enzymes. It functions to attach the amino acid alanine to the corresponding transfer RNA (tRNA^{Ala}) as part of RNA-to-protein translation.

== Clinical significance ==
=== Charcot-Marie-Tooth Disease ===
Charcot-Marie-Tooth Disease type 2 (CMT2) and other peripheral neuropathies have been linked to mutations in the AARS1, GARS1, HARS1, WARS1, and YARS1 genes. Mutations in these genes can encode for faulty aminoacyl-tRNA synthetases, which affects a highly conserved amino acid in the helical domain of cytoplasmic AARS1. This disrupts the ability to charge tRNA with its corresponding amino acids, which leads to impaired protein synthesis. In AARS1, mutations are associated with both autosomal dominant and recessive forms of CMT2.

=== Trichothiodystrophy ===
In addition to its role in CMT2, mutations in the AARS1 gene have also been implicated in non-photosensitive trichothiodystrophy (NPS-TTD), a rare hereditary neurodevelopmental disorder. Trichothiodystrophy (TTD) is defined by sulfur-deficient brittle hair, nails, and scaly skin, but presents with variable clinical features. Unlike the photosensitive form of TTD (PS-TTD), which exhibits features of progressive neuropathy and accelerated aging, NPS-TTD is not associated with premature aging.

Research has identified AARS1, along with methionyl-tRNA synthetase 1 as genes in which variants can contribute to the development NPS-TTD. These variants lead to the instability of the respective enzymes which they encode, affecting the rate of tRNA charging, which is the first step in protein translation.
