= GTF2H4 =

Protein-coding gene in the species Homo sapiens

Identifiers
- Aliases: GTF2H4, general transcription factor IIH, polypeptide 4, 52kDa, P52, TFB2, TFIIH, general transcription factor IIH subunit 4
- External IDs: OMIM: 601760; MGI: 1338799; GeneCards: GTF2H4
Available structures
PDB	Ortholog search: PDBe RCSB
PDB	List of PDB id codes 5IY9, 5IVW, 5IY7, 5IY8, 5IY6

Gene location (Human)
Chr.	Chromosome 6 (human)
Band	6p21.33	Start	30,908,207 bp
Band	6p21.33	End	30,914,106 bp

Gene location (Mouse)
Chr.	Chromosome 17 (mouse)
Band	17|17 B1	Start	35,978,622 bp
Band	17|17 B1	End	35,984,631 bp
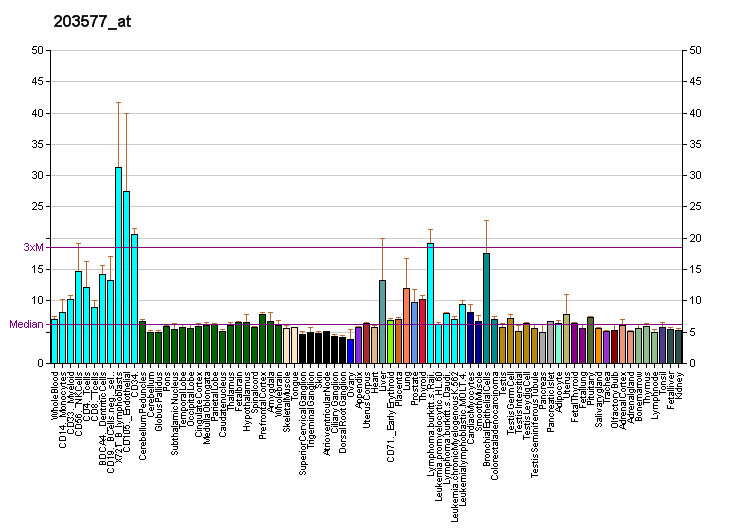
RNA expression pattern
Bgee	Human / Mouse (ortholog); Top expressed in: right lobe of liver; pituitary gland; right hemisphere of cerebellum; anterior pituitary; left lobe of thyroid gland; right lobe of thyroid gland; body of uterus; tibial arteries; right coronary artery; apex of heart / Top expressed in: thymus; otic vesicle; otic placode; spermatocyte; epiblast; saccule; mandibular prominence; abdominal wall; maxillary prominence; ventricular zone; More reference expression data
BioGPS	More reference expression data
Gene ontology
Molecular function	protein kinase activity; ATP-dependent activity, acting on DNA; DNA-binding transcription factor activity; DNA helicase activity; protein binding; RNA polymerase II CTD heptapeptide repeat kinase activity; double-stranded DNA binding; ATPase activator activity; RNA polymerase II general transcription initiation factor activity
Cellular component	nucleoplasm; transcription factor TFIIH holo complex; core TFIIH complex portion of holo TFIIH complex; transcription factor TFIIH core complex; nucleus; transcription factor TFIID complex; nuclear speck
Biological process	termination of RNA polymerase I transcription; regulation of transcription, DNA-templated; phosphorylation of RNA polymerase II C-terminal domain; transcription initiation from RNA polymerase I promoter; transcription elongation from RNA polymerase II promoter; 7-methylguanosine mRNA capping; transcription by RNA polymerase II; transcription, DNA-templated; cellular response to DNA damage stimulus; global genome nucleotide-excision repair; transcription-coupled nucleotide-excision repair; transcription initiation from RNA polymerase II promoter; nucleotide-excision repair, DNA incision; DNA repair; nucleotide-excision repair; nucleotide-excision repair, preincision complex stabilization; nucleotide-excision repair, preincision complex assembly; nucleotide-excision repair, DNA incision, 5'-to lesion; DNA duplex unwinding; positive regulation of ATP-dependent activity; nucleotide-excision repair, DNA duplex unwinding; nucleotide-excision repair, DNA incision, 3'-to lesion; transcription elongation from RNA polymerase I promoter
Sources:Amigo / QuickGO
Orthologs
Databases	NCBI: entry; OMA: entry
Species	Human	Mouse
Entrez	2968	14885
Ensembl	ENSG00000213780	ENSMUSG00000001524
UniProt	Q92759	O70422
RefSeq (mRNA)	NM_001517	NM_010364
RefSeq (protein)	NP_001508	NP_034494
Location (UCSC)	Chr 6: 30.91 – 30.91 Mb	Chr 17: 35.98 – 35.98 Mb
PubMed search
- Wikidata
View/Edit Human	View/Edit Mouse

General transcription factor IIH subunit 4 is a protein that in humans is encoded by the GTF2H4 gene.

== Interactions ==
GTF2H4 has been shown to interact with:

- GTF2F1,
- MED21,
- POLR2A,
- TATA binding protein,
- Transcription Factor II B, and
- XPB.

== See also ==
- Transcription Factor II H
