= Excision repair cross-complementing =

DNA repair encapsulates a multitude of cellular processes that occur within cells, which determine impaired (mostly mutated) sections of DNA and correct the damage in order to uphold its structural integrity and maintain the health of the host body. These mutations can occur naturally due to chance, but also as a result of prolonged unfavorable environmental factors, especially ultraviolet rays. These mutations are countered through different forms of excision repair mechanisms which alter incorrect bases and injured structures: base excision repair (BER), nucleotide excision repair (NER), and mismatch repair. If DNA structures are left unrepaired, senescence, apoptosis, or carcinogenesis will occur due to the continuing destruction. This leads to severe genetic disorders such as xeroderma pigmentosum and Cockayne syndrome (further elaborated below), as well as further general medical concerns such as cancer and rapid aging.

Complementation refers to the relation between two differing strains within an individual that contains the same homozygous recessive mutations leading to the same phenotype. Many studies construct complementation tests in order to determine if two different mutations which result in the same mutant phenotypes are located within the same or different genes. These tests are constructed by utilizing two organisms with recessive mutations, crossing the cells to make a heterozygote, and finally observing the phenotype of the offspring as wild-type or mutant. If the offspring result in wild-type phenotypes (appear normal), it is concluded that the mutations are located in different genes, and complementation has occurred. On the other hand, for offspring resulting in mutant phenotypes, or phenotypes infrequently observed naturally, the mutations are in the same gene, and complementation has not occurred.

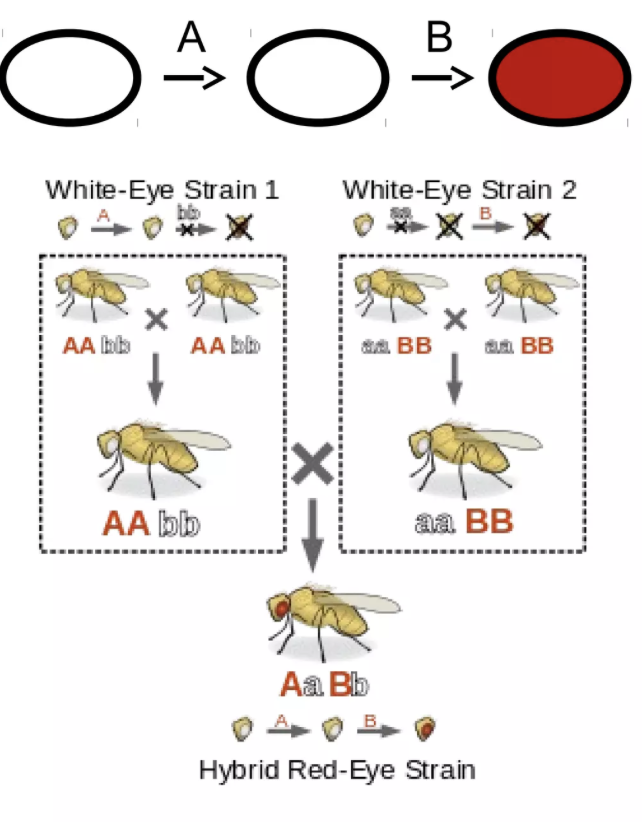
Example of a complementation test, illustrating two mutant phenotypes creating offspring with a wild type phenotype, concluding complementation was present in the metabolic pathway.

Cross complementation, also referred to as Excision Repair Cross-Complementing (ERCC) in humans differs from regular complementation tests, as it aims to identify the genes that can repair, or “rescue”, defects located in other mutated cells through widespread comparisons among multiple genes. In cross complementation (ERCC) tests, defective cells are taken from DNA repair pathways, such as Nucleotide Excision repair (NER), and introduced to a gene from a different mutant via transfection, then observed to conclude if the undamaged gene can restore function to the mutated gene.

== Protein production ==
Excision repair cross complementing (ERCC) genes are key components of the NER pathway and are primarily found in eukaryotic cells, but simpler versions of NER are also located in prokaryotes. The ERCC genes undergo gene expression in order to create the ERCC proteins necessary for DNA repair. During transcription, the DNA sequence of an ERCC gene is utilized as a template in order to create a complementary mRNA strand. This occurrence is regulated by multiple factors, including the TFIIH complex with its XPB and WPD proteins, which influence the initiation, progression, and halting of the transcription process. When the mRNA strand is completed, it is then read by a ribosome, where the mRNA sequence is scanned and an amino acid chain is created, therefore creating an ERCC protein.

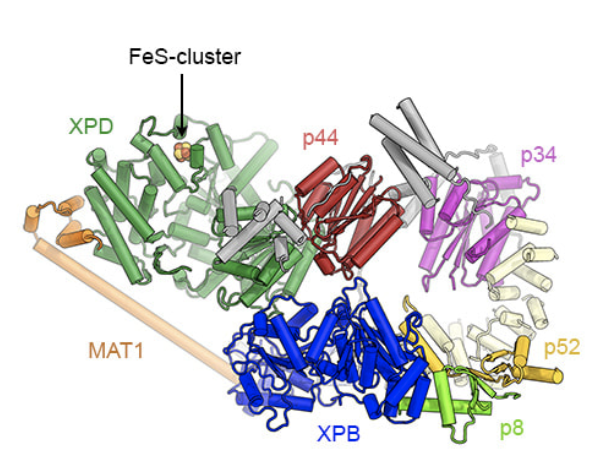
Atomic coordinate model of the cryo-EM structure of the human TFIIH complex at 4.4 Å (Greber BJ et al. 2017)

== Function ==
The majority of studies conducted on excision repair cross-complementing (ERCC) proteins are transcribed from specifically numbered ERCC genes, which have held remarkable clinical significance with upcoming studies, uncovering their pivotal role in upholding the longevity of organisms through their presence within adult stem-cells.

Stem cells contribute largely to the sustainability and life expectancy of all organisms, as they serve to indefinitely replicate themselves, contributing to the maintenance of the

ERCC genes aid in the upkeep of the genome's integrity, therefore protecting stem-cells by safeguarding a space critical to their proliferation. When ERCC genes are absent or deficient in the disease-ridden systems, stem cells struggle with regenerating and repairing tissues composed of damaged DNA, leading to a multitude of severe health issues, including organ degeneration, accelerated aging, and early death. Defects in specific ERCC genes have been linked to genetic disorders, like Cockayne syndrome, paired with ERCC6, and xeroderma pigmentosum, paired with ERCC2, which both substantially negatively affect neurological function in humans.

ERCC proteins directly aid in DNA repair pathways and fix DNA structures with damages caused by factors such as unfavorable levels of exposure to UV radiation, ionized radiation, toxins (including chemical and environmental pollutants), mechanical stress, and more. Maintaining the structure of DNA at pristine states is crucial to the overall health of all organisms, as it maintains genomic sustainability and prevents an increased susceptibility to diseases that originate from the prolonged, growing existence of disrupted genetic material.

== ERCC genes ==
=== ERCC1 ===
==== Relevant studies ====
The human Excision Repair Cross Complementation Group 1 (ERCC1) gene was the first ever identified human gene responsible for DNA repair with molecular cloning. This discovery was observed by researchers in 1982, who isolated DNA-based correction of defected Chinese hamster ovary (CHO) cells. UV-radiation cell lines on the CHO were located at 43-3B and UV20 and designated to the genetic complementation group 1, which was also marked as UV-sensitive. The cells were transfected with human DNA, and subclones were isolated as UV-radiation levels were restored to their normal state. After, specifically selected fragments of human genomes were identified as the subclones of 43-3B cells, and was labelled ERCC1 due to the cross-species complementation of cells belonging to Chinese hamster ovaries and human genomes from a DNA library.

The gene is largely expressed in mammalian tissue cells, and additionally is known as a homolog of the Red10 proteins based in Saccharomyces cerevisiae yeast. This insight was a large discovery, as Rad10 associated with Rad1 proteins to create a nuclease within NER pathways. In additional studies conducted by Zhu et al. (2003), ERCC1-XPR expression in TRF2 deficient cells led to a direct correlation of increased chromosomal end fusions.

==== Structure ====
ERCC1 is found at human chromosome 19q13.32, and includes 10 exons which are ~15 kilobases. The ERCC1 protein contains 297 amino acids, with a molecular weight of 32,500 Da

==== Function ====
ERCC1-XPF is an endonuclease structure essential for NER in replicating and non-replicating cells. The structure creates incisions on the impaired DNA strand, starting from the 5’ direction and working toward its 3’ end. As ERCC1-XPR engages in the incision process required for NER and general DNA repair, it also cooperates with other proteins, XPC-RAD23B, XPA, RPA, TFIIH, and XPG.

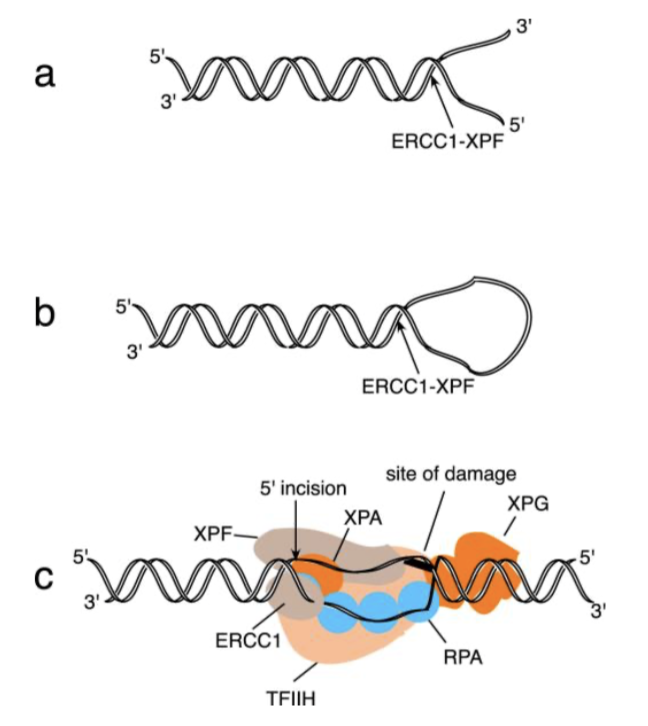
Preincision complex of ERCC1-XPF nuclease and TFIIH, XPA, RPA, and XPG, showing the nuclease cleaving 3’ tails, cutting within the duplex by the junction between single and double stranded DNA.

=== ERCC4 ===
==== Relevant studies ====
Utilizing different experiments, researchers isolated the ERCC4 gene independently through two different methods: the first approach discovered that ERCC1 worked with ERCC4 in the same complex, giving researchers the assumption that ERCC4 was additionally a homolog of RAD 1's Saccharomyces cerevisiae. Further discovery uncovered that the defect originating from CHO complementation group 4 cells were identical to the cellular defects in xeroderma pigmentosum group F (XPF). The second method utilized defective complementation group 4 CHO cells in excision repair cross complementing. A cell line in the fourth complementation group was utilized to assign the ERCC4 gene to a human chromosome and then isolated by complementation. The location of ERCC4 for humans is on the chromosome 16p13.12, including 11 exons spanning around 28.2 kilobases.

is commonly referred to as XPF (XP-F) due to its defective state in the complement group F under xeroderma pigmentosum.

==== Structure ====
The ERCC4 XPF protein is composed of 916 amino acids with a molecular mass of 104,000 Da.

=== ERCC1 and ERCC4 partnership ===
A 2016 study by Boulware, K.S., Manandhar, M., and Wood, R.D., uncovered that the partnered ERCC1 and ERCC4 (XPF) genes encode proteins that build a nuclease that is essential to DNA repair processes and upholding the stability of human chromosomes.

The creation of protein complexes produced by ERCC genes can be exemplified through the partnership of ERCC1 and ERCC4's XPF protein, forming a heterodimer which substitutes as a nuclease while XPB and XPD are included in the aforementioned TFIIH complex.

=== ERCC3 ===
The ERCC3 gene encodes the XPB protein, a helicase part of the subunit within the TFIIH complex. TFIIH plays a large role in the initiation of transcription by RNA polymerase II and XPB/ XPD. The helicase produced by the ERCC2 gene helps unwind the DNA, ensuring that transcription can begin and continue efficiently. Through this function, ERCC3 is vital not only for the expression of individual genes but also for maintaining constant cell growth/development, as well as stress responses.

XPB is also incredibly important in DNA repair. The TFIIH complex is recruited to sites of large, concerning DNA lesions. During NER, XPB's ATP-dependent helicase activity aids by partially unwinding the DNA double helix around the lesion, creating an opening for the repair machinery to enter and attach. Structural studies suggest that XPB acts like a mechanical wedge, prying apart the DNA strands so other NER proteins can carefully remove the damaged nucleotides and replace them with newly synthesized DNA. This dual role in transcription and repair makes XPB indispensable for maintaining the quality of the genome.

Mutations in ERCC3 disrupt XPB's helicase or ATPase activity and can therefore lead to several severe human disorders. Depending on the mutation, ERCC3 defects may cause xeroderma pigmentosum group B (XP-B) and trichothiodystrophy (TTD).

==== Other names for ERCC3 ====
- basic transcription factor 2 89 kDa subunit
- BTF2
- BTF2 p89
- DNA excision repair protein ERCC-3
- DNA repair protein complementing XP-B cells
- ERCC3_HUMAN
- excision repair cross-complementation group 3
- excision repair cross-complementing rodent repair deficiency, complementation group 3
- excision repair cross-complementing rodent repair deficiency, complementation group 3 (xeroderma pigmentosum group B complementing)
- GTF2H
- RAD25
- TFIIH 89 kDa subunit
- TFIIH basal transcription factor complex 89 kDa subunit
- TFIIH basal transcription factor complex helicase XPB subunit
- TFIIH p89
- xeroderma pigmentosum group B-complementing protein
- xeroderma pigmentosum, complementation group B

=== ERCC6 ===
The ERCC6 gene most popularly encodes the Cockayne Syndrome B (CSB) protein, which plays an important role in repairing damaged DNA and supporting gene transcription, which is the beginning step to protein production. DNA damage occurs naturally from ultraviolet radiation, chemicals, exposure to radiation, or free radicals, and is supposed to undergo DNA repair, so the damaged DNA structures do not accumulate and disrupt normal cellular function in the body. Among the multiple DNA repair pathways that cells rely on, the CSB protein is mostly involved in repairing DNA within active genes, or ones actively undergoing transcription.

As RNA polymerase stalls at the lesioned site of the DNA structure, the CSB protein is hypothesized to ideally help remove the RNA polymerase so repair can begin.

==== Other names for ERCC6 ====
- ARMD5
- CKN2
- COFS
- CSB
- ERCC6_HUMAN
- excision repair cross-complementation group 6
- RAD26
- Rad26 (yeast) homolog (20)

== Clinical significance ==
=== Xeroderma pigmentosum ===
Xeroderma Pigmentosum, also commonly referred to as XP, is a rare genetic disorder characterized by an individual's extreme sensitivity to ultraviolet (UV) light as a result of defects in NER. This is not the only result, as the disease also has a profound impact on the individual's skin health and risk of increased susceptibility to cancer. Due to the increased sensitivity to UV rays, severe sunburns, freckling, aging, and changes to pigmentation are common to occur at a much more noticeable rate than patients without XP, dramatically elevating risks of skin cancers, such as basal cell carcinoma, squamous cell carcinomas, and melanomas. In addition, individuals diagnosed with xeroderma pigmentosum are more likely to experience issues with their sight, as they may have corneal damage, photophobia, or conjunctival tumors. Every individual diagnosed with XP has the capability of holding different experiences and different symptoms. 20-30% of diagnosed patients also experience signs of progressive neurological degeneration, such as hearing loss, peripheral neuropathy, cognitive impairment, or more.

The main genes involved are ERCC2, ERCC4, and ERCC5, as they're responsible for specific XP complementation groups. Mutations in ERCC4 genes lead to XP-F, creating an abnormal ERCC-XPR endonuclease complex that is unable to excise UV-induced DNA damage, leading to a buildup and abundance of faulty, impaired DNA structures.

Patients with XP most commonly have mutations on their ERCC2 genes, which leads to XP-D. This variant is likely to produce significant neurological complications, as it combines syndromes within individuals such as XP/TTD (trichothiodystrophy) and XP/CS (Cockayne Syndrome)

=== Cockayne syndrome ===
Cockayne Syndrome is a rare and severe neurodevelopmental disorder caused by mutations in the ERCC6 (CSB) and ERCC8 (CSA) genes, which both are responsible for encoding proteins essential for transcription-coupled nucleotide excision repair (TC-NER). Approximately 60% of cases of diagnosed individuals with Cockayne Syndrome have originated from mutations in ERCC6, responsible for Cockayne Syndrome B, and the remaining patients’ diagnoses are linked to ERCC8. More than 60 pathogenic ERCC6 mutations have been identified by researchers as of the current day. At this point, many of which produce a truncated or structurally altered CSB protein that cannot efficiently coordinate DNA repair or support transcription recovery after damage. Similarly, mutations in ERCC8 hinder the CSA protein efficiency, preventing damaged DNA strands from being recognized and repaired during gene transcription processes. As a result of defective TC-NER, cells accumulate unrepaired DNA structures, which disrupts transcription, then impairing protein production, and ultimately leading to cell dysfunction and death across multiple tissues. Clinically, research has shown that Cockayne syndrome is characterized by symptoms such as growth failure, developmental delay, premature aging, photosensitivity, and neurological deterioration.

The specific mechanisms which link defective ERCC6 and ERCC8 gene function to the full spectrum of symptoms are yet to be completely understood. However, it is believed that impaired DNA repair and transcriptional failure underlie the widespread cellular vulnerability seen in affected individuals. This defective response to DNA damage distinguishes Cockayne syndrome from related repair disorders and explains its combination of developmental abnormalities, heightened UV sensitivity, and progressive tissue degeneration.

=== Trichothiodystrophy ===
Trichothiodystrophy (TTD) is a rare, heritable condition, that is largely believed to be correlated to mutations to the ERCC2 or ERCC3 gene, largely characterized by its negative effect on hair, causing it to be brittle, banded, and sparse. The banding that often occurs is due to a lack of sulfur in the proteins that provide strength and structure to hair strands. Patients with severe TTD may also experience significant intellectual disability, frequent periods of infection and sickness, abnormal red blood cells, elevated A2 hemoglobin, dry skin, and a shortened lifespan. Since the condition is heritable, the symptoms can be visible even in babies, who are more susceptible to premature births, a lower birth weight, and delayed growth, as they may exhibit a shorter build than usual.

Similar to xeroderma pigmentosum, people with TTD also have severe sensitivity to UV rays from the sun, and can develop severe sunburns with little sun exposure.
