= Cyclin-dependent kinase 7 =

Protein-coding gene in the species Homo sapiens

CDK7
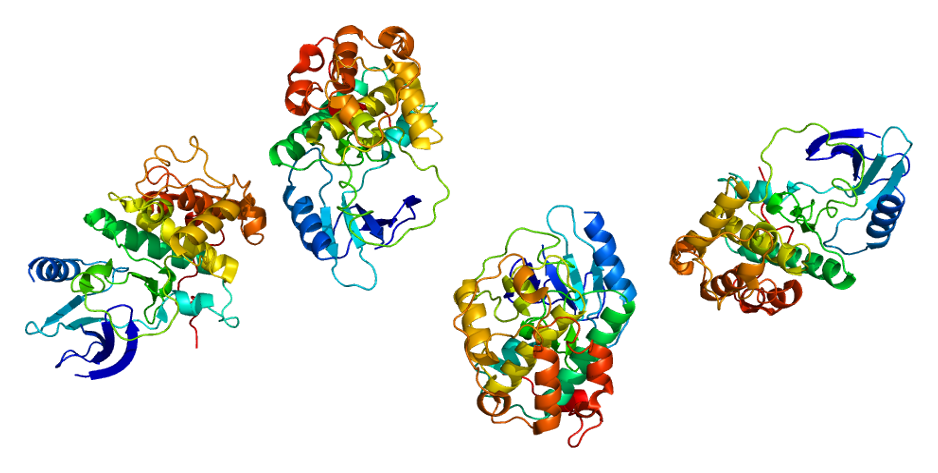

Identifiers
- Aliases: CDK7, CAK1, CDKN7, HCAK, MO15, STK1, p39MO15, CAK, cyclin-dependent kinase 7, cyclin dependent kinase 7
- External IDs: OMIM: 601955; MGI: 102956; GeneCards: CDK7
Available structures
PDB	Ortholog search: PDBe RCSB
PDB	List of PDB id codes 1UA2
Enzyme activity
EC #	BRENDA	ExPASy	KEGG	MetaCyc
2.7.11.22	↗	↗	↗	↗
2.7.11.23	↗	↗	↗	↗

Gene location (Human)
Chr.	Chromosome 5 (human)
Band	5q13.2	Start	69,234,795 bp
Band	5q13.2	End	69,277,430 bp

Gene location (Mouse)
Chr.	Chromosome 13 (mouse)
Band	13 D1|13 53.23 cM	Start	100,839,139 bp
Band	13 D1|13 53.23 cM	End	100,867,447 bp
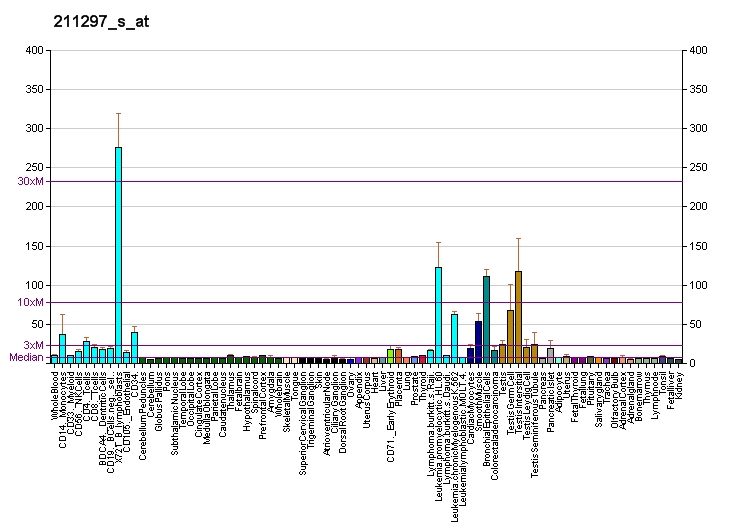
RNA expression pattern
Bgee	Human / Mouse (ortholog); Top expressed in: placenta; gonad; islet of Langerhans; testicle; left testis; olfactory zone of nasal mucosa; right testis; stromal cell of endometrium; zone of skin; skin of leg / Top expressed in: otic placode; primitive streak; abdominal wall; renal corpuscle; calvaria; endocardial cushion; morula; vas deferens; yolk sac; migratory enteric neural crest cell; More reference expression data
BioGPS	More reference expression data
Gene ontology
Molecular function	transferase activity; protein kinase activity; nucleotide binding; ATP-dependent activity, acting on DNA; transcription coactivator activity; protein C-terminus binding; protein binding; androgen receptor binding; RNA polymerase II CTD heptapeptide repeat kinase activity; ATP binding; kinase activity; protein serine/threonine kinase activity; cyclin-dependent protein serine/threonine kinase activity
Cellular component	nucleoplasm; perinuclear region of cytoplasm; nucleus; cytoplasm; cyclin-dependent protein kinase activating kinase holoenzyme complex; transcription factor TFIIH holo complex; transcription factor TFIIK complex
Biological process	termination of RNA polymerase I transcription; androgen receptor signaling pathway; regulation of cyclin-dependent protein serine/threonine kinase activity; regulation of transcription, DNA-templated; phosphorylation; transcription initiation from RNA polymerase I promoter; transcription elongation from RNA polymerase II promoter; 7-methylguanosine mRNA capping; transcription by RNA polymerase II; transcription, DNA-templated; cellular response to DNA damage stimulus; cell division; positive regulation of transcription, DNA-templated; protein phosphorylation; cell cycle; transcription-coupled nucleotide-excision repair; transcription initiation from RNA polymerase II promoter; cell population proliferation; positive regulation of transcription by RNA polymerase II; snRNA transcription by RNA polymerase II; nucleotide-excision repair, preincision complex assembly; DNA repair; protein stabilization; G1/S transition of mitotic cell cycle; G2/M transition of mitotic cell cycle; transcription elongation from RNA polymerase I promoter
Sources:Amigo / QuickGO
Orthologs
Databases	NCBI: entry; OMA: entry
Species	Human	Mouse
Entrez	1022	12572
Ensembl	ENSG00000134058; ENSG00000277273	ENSMUSG00000069089
UniProt	P50613	Q03147
RefSeq (mRNA)	NM_001799; NM_001324069; NM_001324070; NM_001324071; NM_001324072 NM_001324074; NM_001324075; NM_001324077; NM_001324078	NM_009874
RefSeq (protein)	NP_001310998; NP_001310999; NP_001311000; NP_001311001; NP_001311003 NP_001311004; NP_001311006; NP_001311007; NP_001790	NP_034004
Location (UCSC)	Chr 5: 69.23 – 69.28 Mb	Chr 13: 100.84 – 100.87 Mb
PubMed search
- Wikidata
View/Edit Human	View/Edit Mouse

Cyclin-dependent kinase 7, or cell division protein kinase 7, is an enzyme that in humans is encoded by the CDK7 gene.

The protein encoded by this gene is a member of the cyclin-dependent protein kinase (CDK) family. CDK family members are highly similar to the gene products of Saccharomyces cerevisiae cdc28, and Schizosaccharomyces pombe cdc2, and are known to be important regulators of cell cycle progression.

This protein forms a trimeric complex with cyclin H and MAT1, which functions as a CDK-activating kinase (CAK). It is an essential component of Transcription factor II H, which is involved in transcription initiation and DNA repair. This protein is thought to serve as a direct link between the regulation of transcription and the cell cycle.

== Background ==
An intricate network of cyclin-dependent kinases (CDKs) is organized in a pathway to ensure that each cell accurately replicates its DNA and segregates it equally between the two daughter cells. One CDK – the CDK7 complex – cannot be so easily classified. CDK7 is both a CDK-activating kinase (CAK), which phosphorylates cell-cycle CDKs within the activation segment (T-loop), and a component of the general Transcription factor II H, which phosphorylates the C-terminal domain (CTD) of the largest subunit of Pol II. A proposed mode of CDK7 inhibition is the phosphorylation of cyclin H by CDK7 itself or by another kinase.

CDK7 has been observed as a prerequisite to S phase entry and mitosis. CDK7 is activated by the binding of cyclin H and its substrate specificity is altered by the binding of MAT1. The free form of the complex formed, CDK7-cycH-MAT1, operates as CDK-activating kinase (CAK). In vivo, CDK7 forms a stable complex with cyclin H and MAT1 only when its T-loop is phosphorylated on either Ser164 or Thr170 residues.

== The T-loop ==
To be active, most CDKs require not only a cyclin partner but also phosphorylation at one particular site, which corresponds to Thr161 in human CDK1, and which is located within the so-called T-loop (or activation loop) of kinase subdomain VIII. CDKl, CDK2 and CDK4 all require T-loop phosphorylation for maximum activity.

The free form of CDK7-cycH-MAT1 phosphorylates the T-loops of CDK1, CDK2, CDK4 and CDK6. For all CDK substrates of CDK7, phosphorylation by CDK7 occurs following the binding of the substrate kinase to its associated cyclin. This two-step process has been observed in CDK2, where the association of CDK2 with cyclin A results in a conformational change that primes the catalytic site for binding of its ATP substrate and phosphorylation by CDK7 of Thr160 in its activation segment improves the substrate protein's ability to bind. It has been further observed that CDK1 is not phosphorylated by CDK7 in its monomeric form and that monomeric CDK2 and CDK6 are poorly phosphorylated by CDK7, since the activation segment threonine is inaccessible to CDK7 in monomeric CDKs.

While CDK7 is indeed responsible for the phosphorylation of CDK1, CDK2, CDK4 and CDK6 in vivo, it has been observed that they have varying levels of dependence on CDK7. CDK1 and CDK2 require phosphorylation by CDK7 in order to reach their active states, while CDK4 and CDK6 have been found to require consistent CDK7 activity in order to maintain their phosphorylation states. This discrepancy is likely because the phosphorylated T-loops on CDK2 and CDK1 are protected when they are bound to cyclin while the phosphorylated T-loops on CDK4 and CDK6 remain exposed and therefore are vulnerable to phosphatases. It is therefore proposed that phosphatases work to counter the phosphorylation of CDK4 and CDK6 by CDK7, creating a competition between CDK7 and phosphatases.

== Dual activity ==
An entirely new perspective on CDK7 function was opened when CDK7 was identified as a subunit of Transcription factor II H (TF_{II}H) and shown to phosphorylate the carboxy-terminal domain (CTD) of RNA polymerase II (RNAPII). TF_{II}H is a multiprotein complex required not only for class II transcription but also for nucleotide-excision repair. Its associated CTD-kinase activity is considered important for the promoter-clearance step of transcription, but the precise structural consequences of the phosphorylation of the CTD remain the subject of debate. Cyclin H and MAT1 are also present in TF_{II}H, and it is not known what, if anything, distinguishes the TF_{II}H-associated form of CDK7 from the quantitatively predominant free form. Whether CDK7 really displays dual-substrate specificity remains to be further explored, but there is no question that the CDK7-cyclin H-MAT1 complex is able to phosphorylate both the T-loop of CDKs and the YSPTSPS (single-letter code for amino acids) repeats of the RNAPII CTD in vitro.

CDK7-cycH-MAT1 binds to TF_{II}H, which alters the substrate preference of CDK7. CDK7-cycH-MAT1 then preferentially phosphorylates the large subunit C-terminal domain of polymerase II instead of CDK2 when compared to the free-form complex. In addition, phosphorylation of the Thr170 residue on the T-loop of CDK7 has been found to greatly increase activity of the CDK7– cyclin H–MAT1 complex in favor of CTD phosphorylation. Phosphorylation of Thr170, then, is a proposed mechanism for regulating CTD phosphorylation when CDK7 is associated with TF_{II}H.

The role of CDK7 in transcription was confirmed in vivo in Caenorhabditis elegans embryos. Mutants with cdk-7(ax224) were both unable to synthesize most mRNAs and had greatly reduced CTD phosphorylation as well, indicating that CDK7 is required for both transcription and CTD phosphorylation. In addition, similar results have been found in human cells. An "analog sensitive" CDK7 mutant (CDK7as) was devised which operates normally but is inhibited by an ATP analog competitive inhibitor. Inhibition of CDK7as was correlated with a reduction in CTD phosphorylation, where high inhibition led to very little instances of phosphorylated CTD-Ser5 (the phosphorylation target of CDK7 on CTD).

== Stem Cells ==
The CDK7-cycH-MAT1 complex has been found to play a role in the differentiation of embryonic stem cells. It has been observed that the depletion of Cyclin H leads to differentiation of embryonic stem cells. In addition, Spt5, which leads to the differentiation of stem cells upon down-regulation, is a phosphorylation target of CDK7 in vitro, suggesting a possible mechanism by which Cyclin H depletion leads to differentiation.

== Clinical significance ==
=== Cancer ===
Given that CDK7 is involved in two important regulation roles, it's expected that CDK7 regulation may play a role in cancerous cells. Cells from breast cancer tumors were found to have elevated levels of CDK7 and Cyclin H when compared to normal breast cells. It was also found that the higher levels were generally found in ER-positive breast cancer. Together, these findings indicate that CDK7 therapy might make sense for some breast cancer patients. Further confirming these findings, recent research indicates that inhibition of CDK7 may be an effective therapy for HER2-positive breast cancers, even overcoming therapeutic resistance. THZ1 was tested on HER2-positive breast cancer cells and exhibited high potency for the cells regardless of their sensitivity to HER2 inhibitors. This finding was demonstrated in vivo, where inhibition of HER2 and CDK7 resulted in tumor regression in therapeutically resistant HER2+ xenograft models.

Inhibition of HER2 and CDK7 resulted in tumor regression in therapeutically resistant HER2+ xenograft models.

=== HIV latency ===
It has been demonstrated that TF_{II}H is a rate-limiting factor for HIV transcription in unactivated T-cells by using a combination of in vivo ChIP experiments and cell-free transcription studies. The ability of NF-κB to rapidly recruit TF_{II}H during HIV activation in T-cells is an unexpected discovery; however, there are several precedents in the literature of cellular genes that are activated through the recruitment of TF_{II}H. An early and influential paper demonstrated that type I activators such as Sp1 and CTF, which were able to support initiation but were unable to support efficient elongation, were also unable to bind TF_{II}H. By contrast, type II activators such as VP16, p53 and E2F1, which supported both initiation and elongation, were able to bind to TF_{II}H. In one of the most thoroughly characterized transcription systems, scientists have studied the temporal order of recruitment of transcription factors during the activation of the major histocompatibility class II (MHC II) DRA gene by IFN-gamma. Following induction of the CIITA transcription factor by IFN-gamma, there was recruitment of both CDK7 and CDK9 causing RNAP CTD phosphorylation and elongation. Finally, Nissen and Yamamoto (2000), in their studies of the activation of the IL-8 and ICAM-1 promoters, observed enhanced CDK7 recruitment and RNAP II CTD phosphorylation in response to NF-κB activation by TNF.

== Inhibitors ==
The growth suppressor p53 has been shown to interact with cyclin H both in vitro and in vivo. Addition of wild type p53 was found to heavily downregulated CAK activity, resulting in decreased phosphorylation of both CDK2 and CTD by CDK7. Mutant p53 was unable to downregulate CDK7 activity and mutant p21 had no effect on downregulation, indicating that p53 is responsible for negative regulation of CDK7.

In 2017, CT7001, an oral CDK7 inhibitor, started a phase 1 clinical trial.

THZ1 is an inhibitor for CDK7 that selectively forms a covalent bond with the CDK7-cycH-MAT1 complex. This selectivity stems from forming a bond at C312, which is unique to CDK7 within the CDK family. CDK12 and CDK13 could also be inhibited using THZ1 (but at higher concentrations) because they have similar structures in the region surrounding C312. It was found that treatment of 250 nM THZ1 was sufficient to inhibit global transcription and that cancer cell lines were sensitive to much lower concentrations, opening up further research into the efficacy of using THZ1 as a component of cancer therapy, as described above.

In renal cell carcinoma (RCC), the expression of CDK7 was significantly higher in the advanced stage tumors. Besides, the overall survival was significantly shorter in patients with higher CDK7 expression in the tumors. These results suggest that CDK7 may be a potential target for overcoming RCC.

Based on molecular docking results, Ligands-3, 5, 14, and 16 were screened among 17 different Pyrrolone-fused benzosuberene compounds as potent and specific inhibitors without any cross-reactivity against different CDK isoforms. Analysis of MD simulations and MM-PBSA studies, revealed the binding energy profiles of all the selected complexes. Selected ligands performed better than the experimental drug candidate (Roscovitine). Ligands-3 and 14 show specificity for CDK7. These ligands are expected to possess lower risk of side effects due to their natural origin.

In urothelial carcinoma (UC), CDK7 expression is increased in bladder cancer tissues, especially in patients with chemoresistance. CDK7 inhibition-related cancer stemness suppression is a potential therapeutic strategy for both chemonaïve and chemoresistant UC.

== Interactions ==
Cyclin-dependent kinase 7 has been shown to interact with:

- Androgen receptor,
- Cyclin H,
- GTF2H1,
- MNAT1,
- P53,
- SUPT5H, and
- XPB.

== See also ==
- Cell cycle
- Cell cycle checkpoint
- Cyclin-dependent kinase
- Cyclin
- Wee (cell cycle)
