= SYAP1 =

Protein-coding gene in the species Homo sapiens

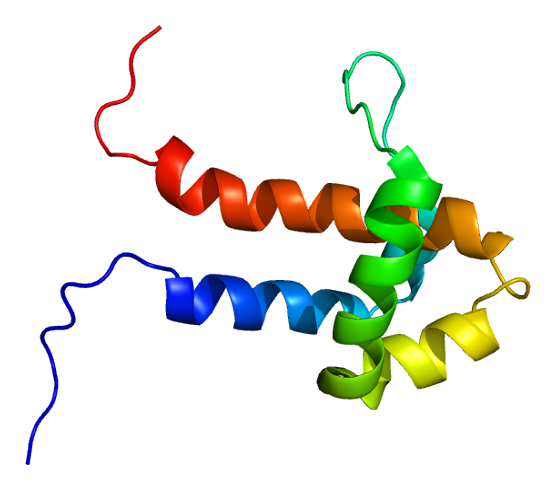
Available structures
PDB	Ortholog search: PDBe RCSB
PDB	List of PDB id codes 1X3A

Identifiers
- Aliases: SYAP1, PRO3113, synapse associated protein 1, BSTA
- External IDs: MGI: 1914293; HomoloGene: 12078; GeneCards: SYAP1; OMA:SYAP1 - orthologs

Gene location (Human)
Chr.	X chromosome (human)
Band	Xp22.2	Start	16,719,612 bp
Band	Xp22.2	End	16,765,340 bp

Gene location (Mouse)
Chr.	X chromosome (mouse)
Band	X|X F4	Start	161,640,053 bp
Band	X|X F4	End	161,671,443 bp
RNA expression pattern
Bgee	Human / Mouse (ortholog); Top expressed in: Achilles tendon; mucosa of ileum; jejunal mucosa; tibialis anterior muscle; myocardium of left ventricle; skin of arm; Skeletal muscle tissue of rectus abdominis; epithelium of nasopharynx; deltoid muscle; bronchial epithelial cell / Top expressed in: white adipose tissue; Epithelium of choroid plexus; vestibular membrane of cochlear duct; brown adipose tissue; subcutaneous adipose tissue; transitional epithelium of urinary bladder; submandibular gland; pineal gland; calvaria; ovary; More reference expression data
BioGPS	n/a
Gene ontology
Molecular function	protein binding
Cellular component	Golgi apparatus; nucleus; nucleoplasm; extracellular exosome; cytosol; cytoplasm; plasma membrane; membrane; cell junction; axon; dendrite; growth cone; extrinsic component of cytoplasmic side of plasma membrane; presynaptic membrane; cell projection; perikaryon; synapse; postsynaptic membrane; perinuclear region of cytoplasm
Biological process	cell differentiation; cellular response to insulin stimulus; cellular response to platelet-derived growth factor stimulus; TORC2 signaling; positive regulation of fat cell differentiation; cellular response to epidermal growth factor stimulus; positive regulation of protein serine/threonine kinase activity; positive regulation of protein homodimerization activity; cellular response to insulin-like growth factor stimulus
Sources:Amigo / QuickGO
Orthologs
Species	Human	Mouse
Entrez	94056	67043
Ensembl	ENSG00000169895	ENSMUSG00000031357
UniProt	Q96A49	Q9D5V6
RefSeq (mRNA)	NM_032796	NM_025932
RefSeq (protein)	NP_116185	NP_080208
Location (UCSC)	Chr X: 16.72 – 16.77 Mb	Chr X: 161.64 – 161.67 Mb
PubMed search
- Wikidata
View/Edit Human	View/Edit Mouse

Synapse-associated protein 1 is a protein that in humans is encoded by the SYAP1 gene.
