= Cyclin H =

Protein-coding gene in the species Homo sapiens

CCNH
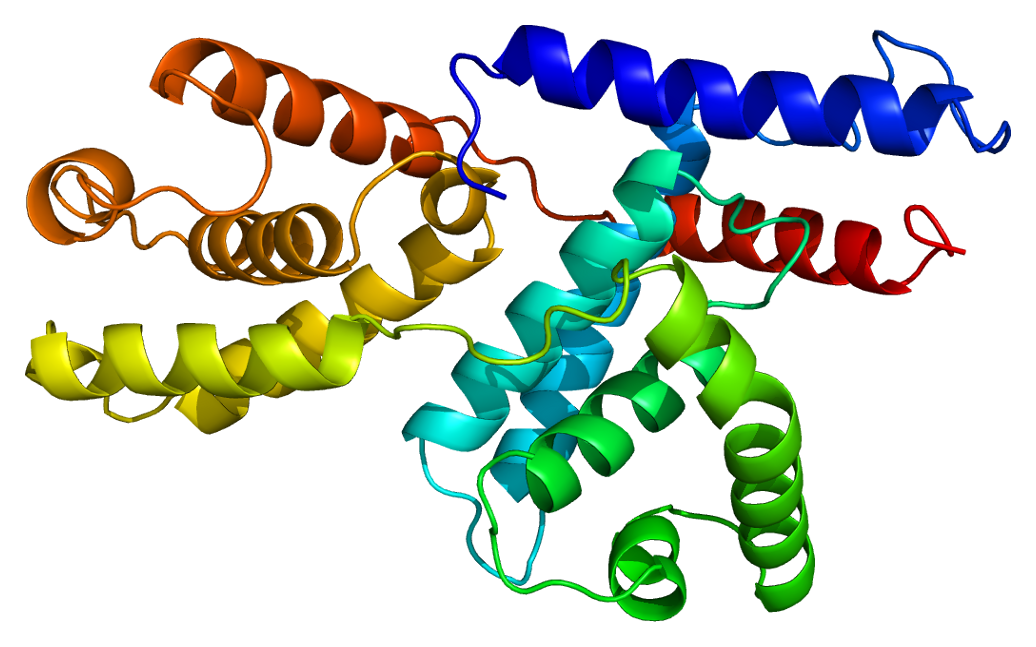

Identifiers
- Aliases: CCNH, CAK, CycH, p34, p37, Cyclin H
- External IDs: OMIM: 601953; MGI: 1913921; GeneCards: CCNH
Available structures
PDB	Ortholog search: PDBe RCSB
PDB	List of PDB id codes 1JKW, 1KXU

Gene location (Human)
Chr.	Chromosome 5 (human)
Band	5q14.3	Start	87,318,416 bp
Band	5q14.3	End	87,412,930 bp

Gene location (Mouse)
Chr.	Chromosome 13 (mouse)
Band	13|13 C3	Start	85,337,527 bp
Band	13|13 C3	End	85,371,588 bp
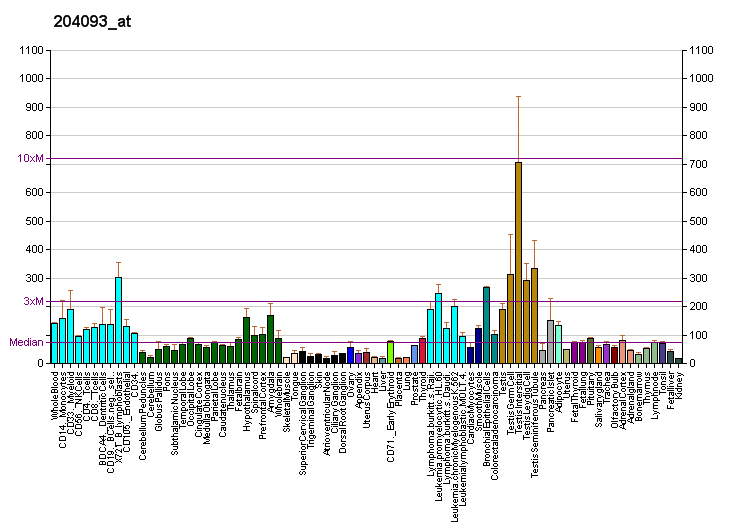
RNA expression pattern
Bgee	Human / Mouse (ortholog); Top expressed in: Achilles tendon; left testis; right testis; ventricular zone; epithelium of colon; ganglionic eminence; anterior pituitary; right lung; sperm; C1 segment / Top expressed in: interventricular septum; fossa; condyle; endothelial cell of lymphatic vessel; vas deferens; primitive streak; facial motor nucleus; otic placode; efferent ductule; Paneth cell; More reference expression data
BioGPS	More reference expression data
Gene ontology
Molecular function	ATP-dependent activity, acting on DNA; kinase activity; cyclin-dependent protein serine/threonine kinase regulator activity; protein binding; RNA polymerase II CTD heptapeptide repeat kinase activity
Cellular component	nucleoplasm; transcription factor TFIIH holo complex; transcription factor TFIIK complex; nucleus; cyclin-dependent protein kinase activating kinase holoenzyme complex; cyclin-dependent protein kinase holoenzyme complex
Biological process	termination of RNA polymerase I transcription; regulation of transcription, DNA-templated; phosphorylation; transcription initiation from RNA polymerase I promoter; transcription elongation from RNA polymerase II promoter; 7-methylguanosine mRNA capping; transcription by RNA polymerase II; transcription, DNA-templated; positive regulation of phosphorylation of RNA polymerase II C-terminal domain; positive regulation of cyclin-dependent protein serine/threonine kinase activity; cell cycle; transcription-coupled nucleotide-excision repair; transcription initiation from RNA polymerase II promoter; positive regulation of transcription by RNA polymerase II; protein phosphorylation; nucleotide-excision repair, preincision complex assembly; protein stabilization; regulation of cyclin-dependent protein serine/threonine kinase activity; regulation of transcription by RNA polymerase II; G1/S transition of mitotic cell cycle; G2/M transition of mitotic cell cycle; transcription elongation from RNA polymerase I promoter
Sources:Amigo / QuickGO
Orthologs
Databases	NCBI: entry; OMA: entry
Species	Human	Mouse
Entrez	902	66671
Ensembl	ENSG00000134480	ENSMUSG00000021548
UniProt	P51946	Q61458
RefSeq (mRNA)	NM_001199189; NM_001239; NM_001363539; NM_001364075; NM_001364076	NM_023243; NM_001347587; NM_001347588
RefSeq (protein)	NP_001186118; NP_001230; NP_001350468; NP_001351004; NP_001351005	NP_001334516; NP_001334517; NP_075732
Location (UCSC)	Chr 5: 87.32 – 87.41 Mb	Chr 13: 85.34 – 85.37 Mb
PubMed search
- Wikidata
View/Edit Human	View/Edit Mouse

Cyclin-H is a protein in humans encoded by the CCNH gene.

== Function ==
The protein encoded by this gene belongs to the highly conserved cyclin family, whose members are characterized by a dramatic periodicity in protein abundance through the cell cycle. Cyclins function as regulators of CDK kinases. Different cyclins exhibit distinct expression and degradation patterns which contribute to the temporal coordination of each mitotic event. This cyclin forms a complex with CDK7 kinase and ring finger protein MAT1. The kinase complex is able to phosphorylate CDK2 and CDC2 kinases, thus functions as a CDK-activating kinase (CAK). This cyclin and its kinase partner are components of TFIIH, as well as RNA polymerase II protein complexes. They participate in two different transcriptional regulation processes, suggesting an important link between basal transcription control and the cell cycle machinery.

== Interactions ==
Cyclin H has been shown to interact with P53, Cyclin-dependent kinase 7 and MNAT1.
