= Transcription factor II H =

Protein complex

general transcription factor IIH, polypeptide 1, 62kDa

Identifiers
- Symbol: GTF2H1
- Alt. symbols: BTF2
- NCBI gene: 2965
- HGNC: 4655
- OMIM: 189972
- RefSeq: NM_005316
- UniProt: P32780

Other data
- Locus: Chr. 11 p15.1-p14
Search for
- Structures: Swiss-model
- Domains: InterPro

general transcription factor IIH, polypeptide 2, 44kDa

Identifiers
- Symbol: GTF2H2
- Alt. symbols: BTF2, TFIIH, BTF2P44, T-BTF2P44
- NCBI gene: 2966
- HGNC: 4656
- OMIM: 601748
- RefSeq: NM_001515
- UniProt: Q13888

Other data
- Locus: Chr. 5 q12.2-13.3
Search for
- Structures: Swiss-model
- Domains: InterPro

general transcription factor IIH, polypeptide 3, 34kDa

Identifiers
- Symbol: GTF2H3
- Alt. symbols: BTF2, TFIIH
- NCBI gene: 2967
- HGNC: 4657
- OMIM: 601750
- RefSeq: NM_001516
- UniProt: Q13889

Other data
- Locus: Chr. 12 q24.31
Search for
- Structures: Swiss-model
- Domains: InterPro

Transcription factor II H (TF_{II}H) is a multi-subunit protein complex involved in both the transcription of protein-coding genes and the nucleotide excision repair (NER) pathway. TF_{II}H was first identified in 1989 as general transcription factor-δ or basic transcription factor 2, an essential factor for transcription in vitro. It was subsequently isolated from yeast and officially named TF_{II}H in 1992.

TF_{II}H is composed of ten subunits. Seven of these—ERCC2/XPD, ERCC3/XPB, GTF2H1/p62, GTF2H4/p52, GTF2H2/p44, GTF2H3/p34, and GTF2H5/TTDA—constitute the core complex. The remaining three subunits—CDK7, MAT1, and cyclin H—form the cyclin-activating kinase (CAK) subcomplex, which is tethered to the core via the XPD protein. Among the core subunits, ERCC2/XPD and ERCC3/XPB possess helicase and ATPase activities and are essential for unwinding DNA to form the transcription bubble. These activities are necessary during transcription in vitro only when the DNA template is not already denatured or is supercoiled.

The CAK subunits, CDK7 and cyclin H, are responsible for the phosphorylation of serine residues in the C-terminal domain of RNA polymerase II, as well as potentially other targets involved in the cell cycle. In addition to its essential role in transcription initiation, TF_{II}H also plays a critical part in nucleotide excision repair.

== History ==
Before being designated as TF_{II}H, the complex was known by several names. It was first isolated in 1989 from rat liver and referred to as transcription factor δ. When identified in cancer cells, it was called basic transcription factor 2, and when isolated from yeast, it was known as transcription factor B. The complex was officially named TF_{II}H in 1992.

== Structure ==
TF_{II}H is a ten‐subunit complex; seven of these subunits comprise the "core" whereas three comprise the dissociable "CAK" (CDK-activating Kinase) module. The core consists of subunits XPB, XPD, p62, p52, p44, p34 and p8 while CAK is composed of CDK7, cyclin H, and MAT1.

== Function ==
General functions of TF_{II}H include:

1. Initiating transcription of protein-coding genes
2. Repairing DNA

=== Gene transcription ===
TF_{II}H is a general transcription factor that helps recruit RNA polymerase II (Pol II) to gene promoters. It acts as a DNA translocase, sliding along the DNA while feeding it into the RNA polymerase II cleft, thereby generating torsional strain that facilitates local DNA unwinding. TF_{II}H also plays a critical role in nucleotide excision repair (NER), where it unwinds DNA at sites of damage following lesion recognition by either the global genome repair (GGR) or transcription-coupled repair (TCR) pathway.

=== DNA repair ===
Mechanism of TF_{II}H repairing DNA damaged sequence

TF_{II}H participates in nucleotide excision repair (NER) by opening the DNA double helix after damage is initially recognized. NER is a multi-step pathway that removes a wide range of different types of damage that distort normal base pairing, including bulky chemical damage and UV-induced damage. Individuals with mutational defects in genes specifying protein components that catalyze the NER pathway, including the TF_{II}H components, often display features of premature aging.

== Clinical significance ==
=== Trichothiodystrophy ===
Mutation in genes ERCC3 (XPB), ERCC2 (XPD) or GTF2H5 (TTDA) cause trichothiodystrophy, a condition characterized by photosensitivity, ichthyosis, brittle hair and nails, intellectual impairment, decreased fertility and/or short stature.

=== Cancer ===
Genetic polymorphisms of genes that encode subunits of TF_{II}H are known to be associated with increased cancer susceptibility in many tissues, e.g. skin tissue, breast tissue and lung tissue. Mutations in the subunits (such as XPD and XPB) can lead to a variety of diseases, including xeroderma pigmentosum (XP) or XP combined with Cockayne syndrome.

=== Viral infection ===
Virus-encoded proteins target TF_{II}H.

=== Inhibitors ===
Potent, bioactive natural products such as triptolide, which inhibit mammalian transcription by targeting the XPB subunit of the general transcription factor TF_{II}H, have recently been developed as glucose conjugates to selectively target hypoxic cancer cells with elevated glucose transporter expression.
