= GTF2H1 =

Protein-coding gene in the species Homo sapiens

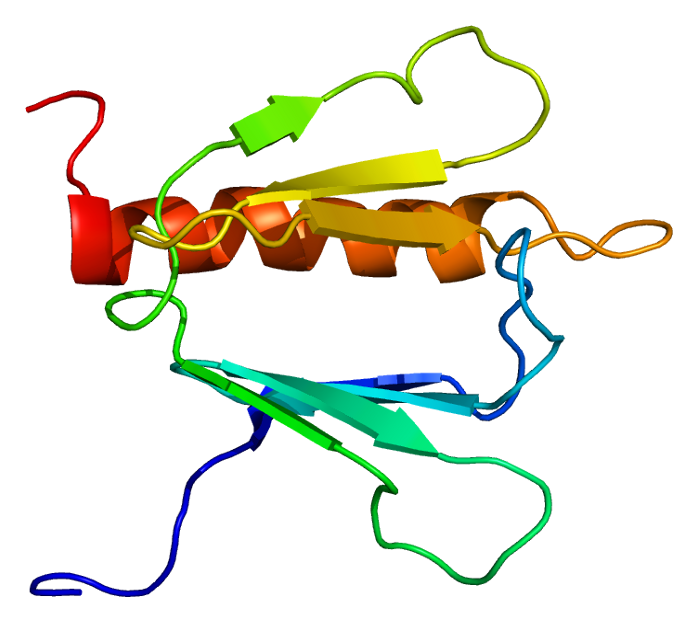

Identifiers
- Aliases: GTF2H1, BTF2, P62, TFB1, TFIIH, general transcription factor IIH subunit 1
- External IDs: OMIM: 189972; MGI: 1277216; GeneCards: GTF2H1
Available structures
| PDB | Ortholog search: PDBe RCSB |
| PDB | List of PDB id codes 1PFJ, 2DII, 2RNR, 2RUK, 2RVB |

Gene location (Human)
| Chr. | Chromosome 11 (human) |
| Band | 11p15.1 | Start | 18,322,295 bp |
| Band | 11p15.1 | End | 18,367,045 bp |

Gene location (Mouse)
| Chr. | Chromosome 7 (mouse) |
| Band | 7|7 B3 | Start | 46,445,527 bp |
| Band | 7|7 B3 | End | 46,473,224 bp |
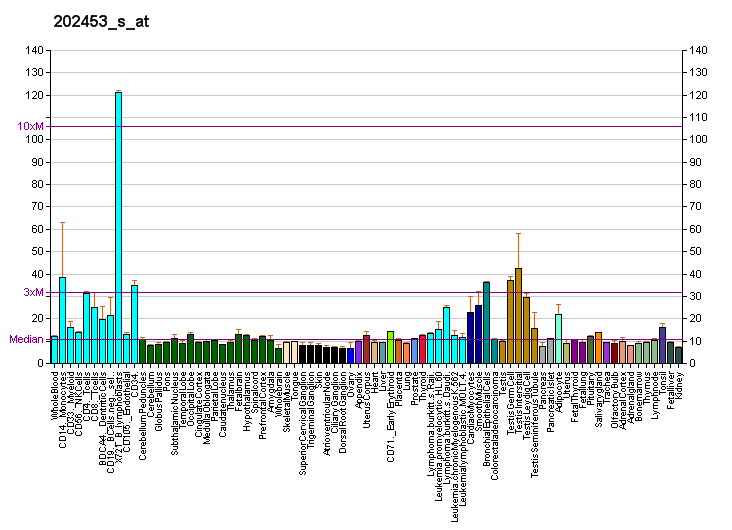

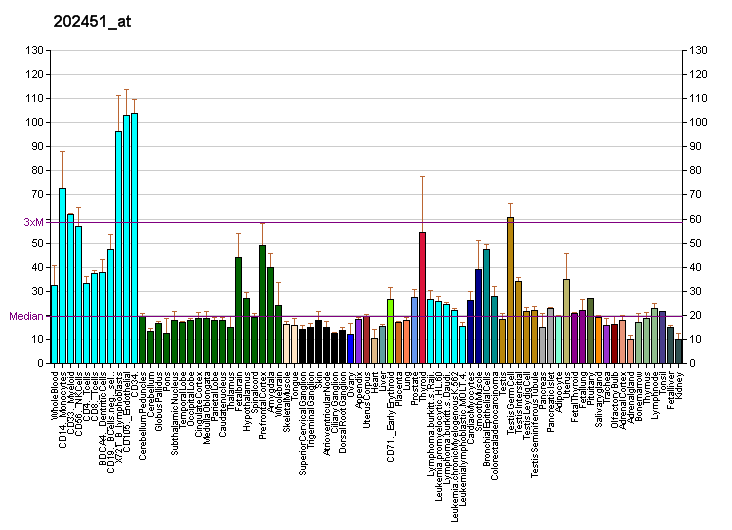
RNA expression pattern
| Bgee | Human / Mouse (ortholog); Top expressed in: Achilles tendon; corpus callosum; endometrium; tonsil; right testis; left testis; monocyte; islet of Langerhans; smooth muscle tissue; gallbladder / Top expressed in: spermatocyte; spermatid; yolk sac; Rostral migratory stream; lacrimal gland; genital tubercle; neural layer of retina; epiblast; morula; endothelial cell of lymphatic vessel; More reference expression data |
| BioGPS | More reference expression data |
Gene ontology
| Molecular function | protein kinase activity; ATP-dependent activity, acting on DNA; chromatin binding; protein binding; RNA polymerase II CTD heptapeptide repeat kinase activity |
| Cellular component | nucleoplasm; transcription factor TFIIH holo complex; nucleus; transcription factor TFIIH core complex |
| Biological process | termination of RNA polymerase I transcription; regulation of cyclin-dependent protein serine/threonine kinase activity; regulation of transcription, DNA-templated; transcription initiation from RNA polymerase I promoter; transcription elongation from RNA polymerase II promoter; 7-methylguanosine mRNA capping; transcription by RNA polymerase II; transcription, DNA-templated; cellular response to DNA damage stimulus; global genome nucleotide-excision repair; transcription-coupled nucleotide-excision repair; transcription initiation from RNA polymerase II promoter; nucleotide-excision repair, DNA incision; DNA repair; positive regulation of transcription by RNA polymerase II; nucleotide-excision repair, preincision complex stabilization; nucleotide-excision repair; nucleotide-excision repair, DNA incision, 5'-to lesion; nucleotide-excision repair, preincision complex assembly; transcription by RNA polymerase I; phosphorylation of RNA polymerase II C-terminal domain; nucleotide-excision repair, DNA duplex unwinding; nucleotide-excision repair, DNA incision, 3'-to lesion; transcription elongation from RNA polymerase I promoter |
Sources:Amigo / QuickGO
Orthologs
| Databases | NCBI: entry; OMA: entry |
| Species | Human | Mouse |
| Entrez | 2965 | 14884 |
| Ensembl | ENSG00000110768; ENSG00000288114 | ENSMUSG00000006599 |
| UniProt | P32780 | Q9DBA9 |
| RefSeq (mRNA) | NM_001142307; NM_005316 | NM_001291075; NM_008186; NM_001360075; NM_001360076 |
| RefSeq (protein) | NP_001135779; NP_005307 | NP_001278004; NP_032212; NP_001347004; NP_001347005 |
| Location (UCSC) | Chr 11: 18.32 – 18.37 Mb | Chr 7: 46.45 – 46.47 Mb |
| PubMed search |
- Wikidata
| View/Edit Human | View/Edit Mouse |

General transcription factor IIH subunit 1 is a protein that in humans is encoded by the GTF2H1 gene.

== Interactions ==
GTF2H1 has been shown to interact with:

- Cyclin-dependent kinase 7,
- E2F1,
- ERCC2,
- Estrogen receptor alpha,
- TCEA1, and
- XPB.

== See also ==
- Transcription Factor II H
