= MNAT1 =

Protein-coding gene in the species Homo sapiens

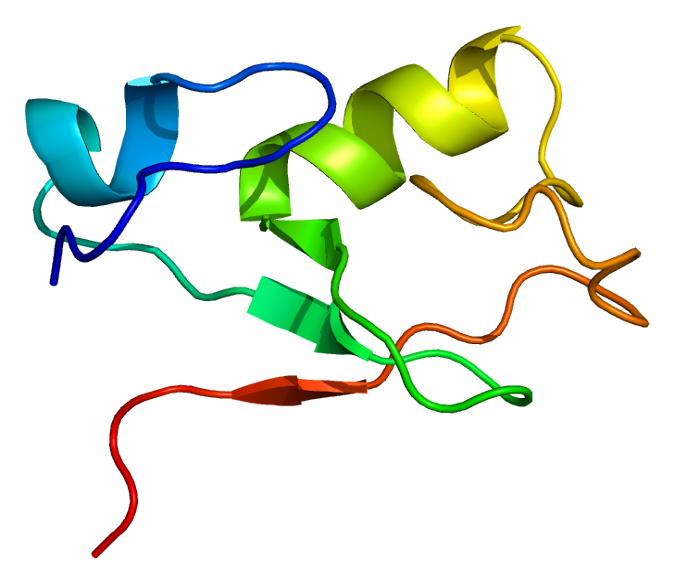

Identifiers
- Aliases: MNAT1, CAP35, MAT1, RNF66, TFB3, CDK activating kinase assembly factor, MNAT1 component of CDK activating kinase
- External IDs: OMIM: 602659; MGI: 106207; GeneCards: MNAT1
Available structures
PDB	Ortholog search: PDBe RCSB
PDB	List of PDB id codes 1G25

Gene location (Human)
Chr.	Chromosome 14 (human)
Band	14q23.1	Start	60,734,742 bp
Band	14q23.1	End	60,969,965 bp

Gene location (Mouse)
Chr.	Chromosome 12 (mouse)
Band	12|12 C3	Start	73,170,491 bp
Band	12|12 C3	End	73,320,762 bp
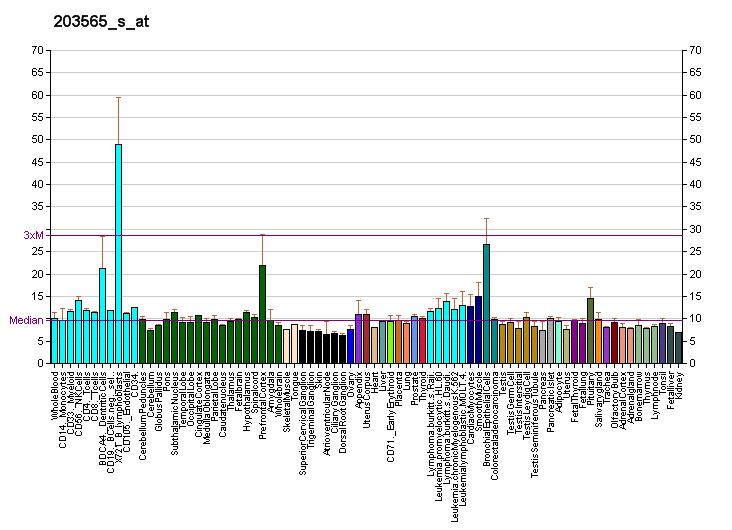
RNA expression pattern
Bgee	Human / Mouse (ortholog); Top expressed in: Achilles tendon; muscle of thigh; gastrocnemius muscle; olfactory zone of nasal mucosa; ventricular zone; ganglionic eminence; popliteal artery; tibial arteries; right uterine tube; testicle / Top expressed in: tail of embryo; epiblast; primitive streak; embryo; embryo; lens; genital tubercle; yolk sac; ventricular zone; mandibular prominence; More reference expression data
BioGPS	More reference expression data
Gene ontology
Molecular function	ATP-dependent activity, acting on DNA; protein N-terminus binding; metal ion binding; protein binding; RNA polymerase II CTD heptapeptide repeat kinase activity; cyclin-dependent protein serine/threonine kinase activator activity; zinc ion binding
Cellular component	nucleoplasm; nucleus; cytosol; transcription factor TFIIH holo complex; cyclin-dependent protein kinase activating kinase holoenzyme complex
Biological process	termination of RNA polymerase I transcription; regulation of cyclin-dependent protein serine/threonine kinase activity; regulation of transcription, DNA-templated; adult heart development; regulation of transcription by RNA polymerase II; transcription initiation from RNA polymerase I promoter; transcription elongation from RNA polymerase II promoter; negative regulation of apoptotic process; 7-methylguanosine mRNA capping; transcription by RNA polymerase II; ventricular system development; transcription, DNA-templated; response to calcium ion; cell cycle; transcription-coupled nucleotide-excision repair; transcription initiation from RNA polymerase II promoter; cell population proliferation; DNA repair; positive regulation of transcription by RNA polymerase II; positive regulation of smooth muscle cell proliferation; protein phosphorylation; nucleotide-excision repair, preincision complex assembly; positive regulation of cyclin-dependent protein serine/threonine kinase activity; nucleotide-excision repair; protein-containing complex assembly; G1/S transition of mitotic cell cycle; negative regulation of DNA helicase activity; G2/M transition of mitotic cell cycle; transcription elongation from RNA polymerase I promoter
Sources:Amigo / QuickGO
Orthologs
Databases	NCBI: entry; OMA: entry
Species	Human	Mouse
Entrez	4331	17420
Ensembl	ENSG00000020426	ENSMUSG00000021103
UniProt	P51948	P51949
RefSeq (mRNA)	NM_001177963; NM_002431	NM_008612
RefSeq (protein)	NP_001171434; NP_002422	NP_032638
Location (UCSC)	Chr 14: 60.73 – 60.97 Mb	Chr 12: 73.17 – 73.32 Mb
PubMed search
- Wikidata
View/Edit Human	View/Edit Mouse

CDK-activating kinase assembly factor MAT1 is an enzyme that in humans is encoded by the MNAT1 gene.

== Interactions ==
MNAT1 has been shown to interact with:

- Cyclin H,
- Cyclin-dependent kinase 7,
- Estrogen receptor alpha,
- MCM7,
- MTA1,
- P53, and
- POU2F1.
