= Trichothiodystrophy =

- Other names: Amish brittle hair syndrome, BIDS syndrome, brittle hair–intellectual impairment–decreased fertility–short stature syndrome
- This condition is inherited in an autosomal recessive manner.
- Specialty: Dermatology, medical genetics
- Frequency: 0.0001%

Trichothiodystrophy (TTD) is an autosomal recessive inherited disorder characterised by brittle hair and intellectual impairment. The word breaks down into tricho – "hair", thio – "sulphur", and dystrophy – "wasting away" or literally "bad nourishment". TTD is associated with a range of symptoms connected with organs of the ectoderm and neuroectoderm. TTD may be subclassified into four syndromes: Approximately half of all patients with trichothiodystrophy have photosensitivity, which divides the classification into syndromes with or without photosensitivity; BIDS and PBIDS, and IBIDS and PIBIDS. Modern covering usage is TTD-P (photosensitive), and TTD.

== Presentation ==
Features of TTD can include photosensitivity, ichthyosis, brittle hair and nails, intellectual impairment, decreased fertility and short stature. A more subtle feature associated with this syndrome is a "tiger tail" banding pattern in hair shafts, seen in microscopy under polarized light. The acronyms PIBIDS, IBIDS, BIDS and PBIDS give the initials of the words involved. BIDS syndrome, also called Amish brittle hair brain syndrome and hair-brain syndrome, is an autosomal recessive inherited disease. It is nonphotosensitive. BIDS is characterized by brittle hair, intellectual impairment, decreased fertility, and short stature. There is a photosensitive syndrome, PBIDS.

BIDS is associated with the gene MPLKIP (TTDN1). IBIDS syndrome, following the acronym from ichthyosis, brittle hair and nails, intellectual impairment and short stature, is the Tay syndrome or sulfur-deficient brittle hair syndrome, first described by Tay in 1971. (Chong Hai Tay was the Singaporean doctor who was the first doctor in South East Asia to have a disease named after him.) Tay syndrome should not be confused with the Tay–Sachs disease. It is an autosomal recessive congenital disease. In some cases, it can be diagnosed prenatally. IBIDS syndrome is nonphotosensitive.

== Cause ==
The photosensitive form is referred to as PIBIDS, and is associated with ERCC2/XPD and ERCC3.

=== Photosensitive forms ===
All photosensitive TTD syndromes have defects in the nucleotide excision repair (NER) pathway, which is a vital DNA repair system that removes many kinds of DNA lesions. This defect is not present in the nonphotosensitive TTD's. These types of defects can result in other rare autosomal recessive diseases like xeroderma pigmentosum and Cockayne syndrome.

=== DNA repair ===
Currently, mutations in four genes are recognized as causing the TTD phenotype, namely TTDN1, ERCC3/XPB, ERCC2/XPD and TTDA. Individuals with defects in XPB, XPD and TTDA are photosensitive, whereas those with a defect in TTDN1 are not. The three genes, XPB, XPD and TTDA, encode protein components of the multi-subunit transcription/repair factor IIH (TFIIH). This complex factor is an important decision maker in NER that opens the DNA double helix after damage is initially recognized. NER is a multi-step pathway that removes a variety of different DNA damages that alter normal base pairing, including both UV-induced damages and bulky chemical adducts. Features of premature aging often occur in individuals with mutational defects in genes specifying protein components of the NER pathway, including those with TTD (see DNA damage theory of aging).

=== Non-Photosensitive forms ===
The non-photosensitive forms are caused by AARS1, CARS1, TTDN1, RNF113A, TARS1 and MARS1 genes. The function of AARS1, CARS1 and TARS1 gene are to charge tRNAs with amino acid. According to one study, the TTDN1 gene plays role in mitosis. Some study suggests that the RNF113A gene is a part of spliceosome and it can terminate CXCR4 pathway through CXCR4 Ubiquitination.

RNF113A causes X-linked recessive form of TTD.

== Diagnosis ==
The diagnosis of TTD can by made by showing low sulfur content by biochemical assay of hair shafts, also, it can by following findings:

- Trichoschisis (broken or split hairs)
- Alternating light and dark bands called 'tiger-tail pattern' are found in the hair shaft, which can be detected by polarised light microscopy or trichoscopy
- A severely damaged or absent hair cuticle can be seen by electron microscopy scanning

== Treatment ==
This disease doesn't have a cure, although it can be managed symptomatically. Patients with Photosensetive forms should be provided with sun protection.

== See also ==
- Skin lesion
- List of cutaneous conditions
- Hair defect-photosensitivity-intellectual disability syndrome, a similar syndrome, but without known metabolic aberration
