= ERCC2 =

Mammalian protein found in humans

Identifiers
- Aliases: ERCC2, excision repair cross-complementation group 2, COFS2, EM9, TFIIH, TTD, XPD, TTD1, ERCC excision repair 2, TFIIH core complex helicase subunit
- External IDs: OMIM: 126340; MGI: 95413; GeneCards: ERCC2
Available structures
PDB	Ortholog search: PDBe RCSB
PDB	List of PDB id codes 5IY9, 5IVW, 5IY7, 5IY8, 5IY6
Enzyme activity
EC #	BRENDA	ExPASy	KEGG	MetaCyc
5.6.2.3	↗	↗	↗	↗

Gene location (Human)
Chr.	Chromosome 19 (human)
Band	19q13.32	Start	45,349,837 bp
Band	19q13.32	End	45,370,918 bp

Gene location (Mouse)
Chr.	Chromosome 7 (mouse)
Band	7 A3|7 9.62 cM	Start	19,115,935 bp
Band	7 A3|7 9.62 cM	End	19,129,619 bp
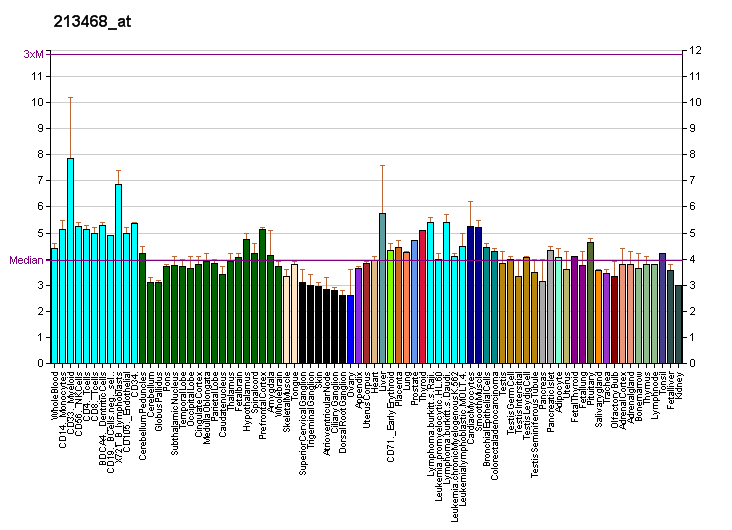
RNA expression pattern
Bgee	Human / Mouse (ortholog); Top expressed in: stromal cell of endometrium; right adrenal gland; left adrenal gland; right adrenal cortex; ganglionic eminence; left adrenal cortex; ventricular zone; right testis; left testis; prefrontal cortex / Top expressed in: spermatocyte; Ileal epithelium; neural layer of retina; ventricular zone; epiblast; yolk sac; lip; muscle of thigh; superior frontal gyrus; spermatid; More reference expression data
BioGPS	More reference expression data
Gene ontology
Molecular function	DNA binding; 4 iron, 4 sulfur cluster binding; protein kinase activity; ATP-dependent activity, acting on DNA; nucleotide binding; helicase activity; protein N-terminus binding; iron-sulfur cluster binding; DNA helicase activity; metal ion binding; hydrolase activity, acting on acid anhydrides, in phosphorus-containing anhydrides; protein C-terminus binding; protein binding; nucleic acid binding; RNA polymerase II CTD heptapeptide repeat kinase activity; 5'-3' DNA helicase activity; hydrolase activity; ATP binding; damaged DNA binding; protein-macromolecule adaptor activity
Cellular component	cytoplasm; cyclin-dependent protein kinase activating kinase holoenzyme complex; spindle; transcription factor TFIIH holo complex; transcription factor TFIIH core complex; cytoskeleton; nucleus; MMXD complex; nucleoplasm; transcription factor TFIID complex; cytosol; CAK-ERCC2 complex
Biological process	termination of RNA polymerase I transcription; regulation of mitotic cell cycle phase transition; bone mineralization; hair cycle process; response to hypoxia; regulation of transcription, DNA-templated; embryonic cleavage; hair follicle maturation; multicellular organism growth; chromosome segregation; transcription initiation from RNA polymerase I promoter; transcription elongation from RNA polymerase II promoter; hair cell differentiation; ageing; extracellular matrix organization; in utero embryonic development; 7-methylguanosine mRNA capping; transcription by RNA polymerase II; post-embryonic development; response to oxidative stress; transcription, DNA-templated; cellular response to DNA damage stimulus; positive regulation of transcription, DNA-templated; global genome nucleotide-excision repair; hematopoietic stem cell differentiation; spinal cord development; UV protection; positive regulation of DNA binding; central nervous system myelin formation; transcription-coupled nucleotide-excision repair; transcription initiation from RNA polymerase II promoter; cell population proliferation; nucleotide-excision repair, DNA incision; nucleobase-containing compound metabolic process; response to UV; positive regulation of transcription by RNA polymerase II; skin development; erythrocyte maturation; apoptotic process; nucleotide-excision repair; nucleotide-excision repair, preincision complex stabilization; DNA repair; viral process; protein phosphorylation; nucleotide-excision repair, preincision complex assembly; nucleotide-excision repair, DNA incision, 5'-to lesion; embryonic organ development; DNA duplex unwinding; regulation of mitotic recombination; nucleotide-excision repair, DNA duplex unwinding; positive regulation of mitotic recombination; nucleotide-excision repair, DNA incision, 3'-to lesion; transcription elongation from RNA polymerase I promoter
Sources:Amigo / QuickGO
Orthologs
Databases	NCBI: entry; OMA: entry
Species	Human	Mouse
Entrez	2068	13871
Ensembl	ENSG00000104884	ENSMUSG00000030400
UniProt	P18074	O08811
RefSeq (mRNA)	NM_000400; NM_001130867	NM_007949; NM_001363981
RefSeq (protein)	NP_000391; NP_001124339	NP_031975; NP_001350910
Location (UCSC)	Chr 19: 45.35 – 45.37 Mb	Chr 7: 19.12 – 19.13 Mb
PubMed search
- Wikidata
View/Edit Human	View/Edit Mouse

TFIIH subunit XPD is a protein that in humans is encoded by the ERCC2 (ERCC excision repair 2) gene. It is a component of the general transcription and DNA repair factor IIH (TFIIH) core complex involved in transcription-coupled nucleotide excision repair.

Along with XPB, XPD is a part of human transcriptional initiation factor TFIIH and has ATP-dependent helicase activity. It belongs to the RAD3/XPD subfamily of helicases.

The XPD (ERCC2) gene encodes for a 2.3-kb mRNA containing 22 exons and 21 introns. The XPD protein contains 760 amino acids and is a polypeptide with a size of 87kDa. Defects in this gene can result in three different disorders: the cancer-prone syndrome xeroderma pigmentosum complementation group D, photosensitive trichothiodystrophy, and Cockayne syndrome.

XPD is essential for the viability of cells. Deletion of XPD in mice is lethal for developing embryos.

XPD helicase is also employed in p53-mediated apoptotic cell death.

== Function ==
The ERCC2/XPD protein participates in nucleotide excision repair and is used in unwinding the DNA double helix after damage is initially identified. Nucleotide excision repair is a multi-step pathway that removes a wide range of different damages that distort normal base pairing. Such damages include bulky chemical adducts, ultraviolet-induced pyrimidine dimers, and several forms of oxidative damage.

The protein named XPD is expressed under the directions of the ERCC2 gene. The XPD protein is an indispensable part of the general transcription factor IIH (TFIIH) complex, which is a group of proteins. The two vital functions of the TFIIH complex are gene transcription and repairing damaged DNA. With the help of gene transcription, the TFIIH complex is able to control the functioning of many different genes in the body and the XPD protein acts as a stabilizer. XPB is another protein in the general transcription factor IIH (TFIIH) complex and is made from the ERCC3 gene, which works in coordination with XDP protein to commence the process of gene transcription.

Ultraviolet rays emerging from the sun, various hazardous chemicals, harmful radiations, are all known parameters for the sabotage of the DNA. A normal and healthy cell has the capability to fix the DNA damages before the problems begin due to the damaged DNA. Cells use nucleotide excision repair to fix damaged DNA. As a part of the process, the double-stranded DNA that encircles the damage is separated by the TFIIH complex. The XPD protein acts as a helicase and helps with the nucleotide excision repair process by binding to the specific regions of DNA and by unwinding the two DNA spiral strands. This exposes the damaged protein which allows the other proteins to remove the damaged section and replace the impaired area with the correct DNA.

== Clinical significance ==
=== Mutations ===
Mutations in the ERCC2/XPD gene can lead to various syndromes, either xeroderma pigmentosum (XP), trichothiodystrophy (TTD) or a combination of XP and TTD (XPTTD), or a combination of XP and Cockayne syndrome (XPCS). TTD and CS both display features of premature aging. These features may include sensorineural deafness, retinal degeneration, white matter hypomethylation, central nervous system calcification, reduced stature, and cachexia (loss of subcutaneous fat tissue). XPCS and TTD fibroblasts from ERCC2/XPD mutant human and mouse show evidence of defective repair of oxidative DNA damages that may underlie the segmental progeroid (premature aging) symptoms (see DNA damage theory of aging).

=== Xeroderma pigmentosum ===
Xeroderma pigmentosum (XP) is associated with the lack of DNA repair mechanism and high susceptibility of cancer. A slight insufficiency in the DNA repair mechanism may result in the development of cancer. Some cancers have been recognized with the help of the relation between the single nucleotide polymorphism and genes. The XPD protein produced by the ERCC2 gene plays an important role in the process of transcription and cell death and is also known for nucleotide excision repair pathway. Various literature studies have reviewed the correlation between polymorphisms in ERCC2 and reduced DNA repair efficiency and their influence on the development of the cancers as well as interaction with environmental exposures.

The second most common cause of xeroderma pigmentosum in the United States are due to mutations in ERCC2 gene, more than twenty-five of which have been observed in people with this disease. The xeroderma pigmentosum is caused when the ERCC2 gene prevents the TFIIH complex from repairing the damaged DNA constructively.

Consequently, all the deformity collects inside the DNA, sabotaging the repair mechanism and results in the cancerous or dead cells. Thus, the people suffering from xeroderma pigmentosum are highly sensitive to the ultraviolet rays from the sunlight due to the DNA repair problems.

So, when ultraviolet rays harm the genes, the cell grows and divides in an uncontrolled fashion and is highly prone to be cancerous. Xeroderma pigmentosum have high risk of developing cancer in skin and eyes as they are the areas mostly exposed to sun. Xeroderma pigmentosum caused by ERCC2 mutations is associated with the numerable developmental neurological malfunctioning which includes; hearing loss, poor coordination, mobility issues, lack of intellectual abilities, difficulties in talking, walking, swallowing the food and seizures.

Researchers suspect that these neurological abnormalities are due to the accumulation of DNA damage despite the brain not being exposed to ultraviolet rays. Other factors might cause the DNA damage in nerve cells as well.

== Interactions ==
ERCC2 has been shown to interact with:

- ERCC5,
- GTF2H1,
- GTF2H2, and
- XPB.

== Interactive pathway map ==
Click on genes, proteins and metabolites below to link to respective articles. (Note: The interactive pathway map can be edited at WikiPathways: "FluoropyrimidineActivity_WP1601".)

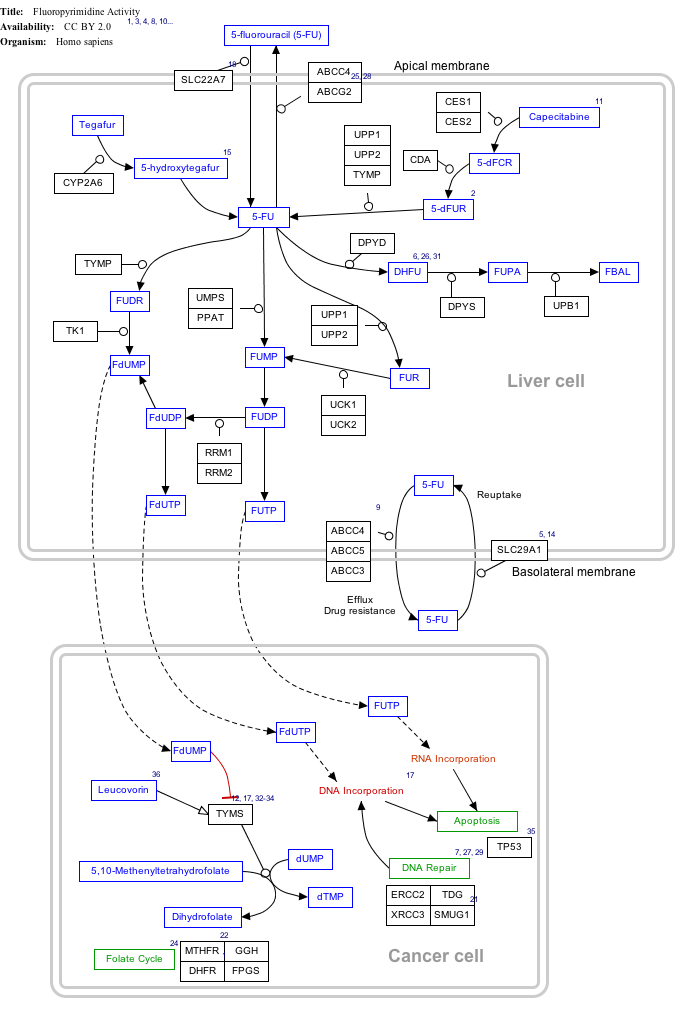

Fluorouracil (5-FU) Activity edit

== See also ==
- Excision repair cross-complementing
