= ERCC3 =

Mammalian protein found in Homo sapiens

Identifiers
- Aliases: ERCC3, excision repair cross-complementation group 3, BTF2, GTF2H, RAD25, TFIIH, XPB, TTD2, ERCC excision repair 3, TFIIH core complex helicase subunit, Ssl2
- External IDs: OMIM: 133510; MGI: 95414; GeneCards: ERCC3
Available structures
PDB	Ortholog search: PDBe RCSB
PDB	List of PDB id codes 4ERN, 5IY9, 5IVW, 5IY7, 5IY8, 5IY6
Enzyme activity
EC #	BRENDA	ExPASy	KEGG	MetaCyc
5.6.2.4	↗	↗	↗	↗

Gene location (Human)
Chr.	Chromosome 2 (human)
Band	2q14.3	Start	127,257,290 bp
Band	2q14.3	End	127,294,166 bp

Gene location (Mouse)
Chr.	Chromosome 18 (mouse)
Band	18|18 B1	Start	32,373,353 bp
Band	18|18 B1	End	32,403,204 bp
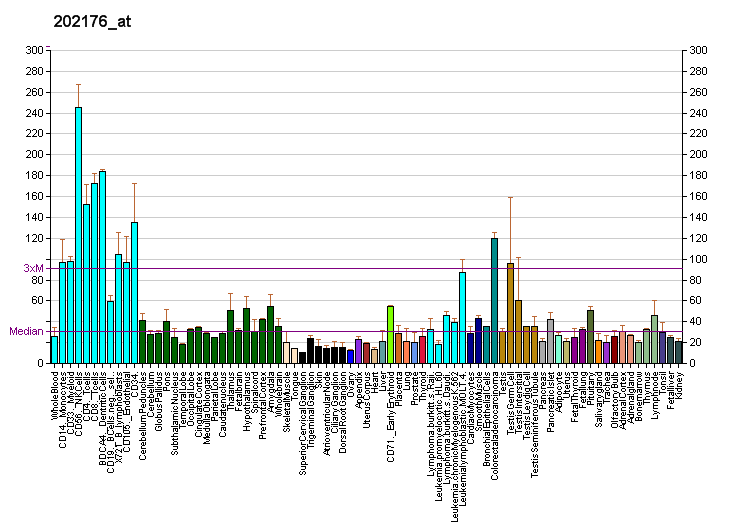
RNA expression pattern
Bgee	Human / Mouse (ortholog); Top expressed in: sural nerve; right hemisphere of cerebellum; right uterine tube; gastric mucosa; gonad; granulocyte; ganglionic eminence; body of uterus; anterior pituitary; canal of the cervix / Top expressed in: spermatid; renal corpuscle; granulocyte; endothelial cell of lymphatic vessel; ventricular zone; epiblast; tail of embryo; medullary collecting duct; lumbar spinal ganglion; yolk sac; More reference expression data
BioGPS	More reference expression data
Gene ontology
Molecular function	protein C-terminus binding; nucleotide binding; DNA helicase activity; protein kinase activity; hydrolase activity; ATP-dependent activity, acting on DNA; protein N-terminus binding; 3'-5' DNA helicase activity; ATP binding; damaged DNA binding; DNA binding; transcription factor binding; protein binding; helicase activity; RNA polymerase II CTD heptapeptide repeat kinase activity; ATPase activity; DNA translocase activity
Cellular component	transcription factor TFIIH core complex; nucleus; nucleoplasm; transcription factor TFIIH holo complex; transcription factor TFIID complex; nucleotide-excision repair factor 3 complex; transcription preinitiation complex
Biological process	response to hypoxia; termination of RNA polymerase I transcription; embryonic organ development; transcription, DNA-templated; response to UV; 7-methylguanosine mRNA capping; nucleotide-excision repair, DNA incision; regulation of mitotic cell cycle phase transition; apoptotic process; positive regulation of apoptotic process; protein phosphorylation; hair cell differentiation; response to oxidative stress; UV protection; cellular response to DNA damage stimulus; transcription initiation from RNA polymerase II promoter; global genome nucleotide-excision repair; protein localization; transcription elongation from RNA polymerase II promoter; regulation of transcription, DNA-templated; positive regulation of transcription by RNA polymerase II; DNA topological change; transcription initiation from RNA polymerase I promoter; transcription by RNA polymerase II; transcription-coupled nucleotide-excision repair; nucleotide-excision repair; nucleotide-excision repair, preincision complex stabilization; DNA repair; viral process; nucleotide-excision repair, preincision complex assembly; nucleotide-excision repair, DNA incision, 5'-to lesion; nucleotide-excision repair, DNA duplex unwinding; regulation of mitotic recombination; promoter clearance from RNA polymerase II promoter; transcription open complex formation at RNA polymerase II promoter; regulation of transposition, RNA-mediated; phosphorylation of RNA polymerase II C-terminal domain; regulation of RNA polymerase II regulatory region sequence-specific DNA binding; nucleotide-excision repair, DNA incision, 3'-to lesion; transcription elongation from RNA polymerase I promoter
Sources:Amigo / QuickGO
Orthologs
Databases	NCBI: entry; OMA: entry
Species	Human	Mouse
Entrez	2071	13872
Ensembl	ENSG00000163161	ENSMUSG00000024382
UniProt	P19447	P49135
RefSeq (mRNA)	NM_000122; NM_001303416; NM_001303418	NM_133658
RefSeq (protein)	NP_000113; NP_001290345; NP_001290347	NP_598419
Location (UCSC)	Chr 2: 127.26 – 127.29 Mb	Chr 18: 32.37 – 32.4 Mb
PubMed search
- Wikidata
View/Edit Human	View/Edit Mouse

ERCC excision repair 3 is a protein that in humans is encoded by the ERCC3 gene (also denoted XPB, xeroderma pigmentosum type B). The ERCC3 protein functions as an ATP-dependent DNA helicase in humans that is a part of the TFIIH transcription factor complex.

== Structure ==
The 3D-structure of the archaeal homolog of XPB has been solved by X-ray crystallography by Dr. John Tainer and his group at The Scripps Research Institute.

== Function ==
XPB plays a significant role in normal basal transcription, transcription coupled repair (TCR), and nucleotide excision repair (NER). Purified XPB has been shown to unwind DNA with 3’-5’ polarity.

The function of the XPB(ERCC3) protein in NER is to assist in unwinding the DNA double helix after damage is initially recognized. NER is a multi-step pathway that removes a wide range of different DNA damages that distort normal base pairing. Such damages include bulky chemical adducts, UV-induced pyrimidine dimers, and several forms of oxidative damage. Mutations in the XPB(ERCC3) gene can lead, in humans, to xeroderma pigmentosum (XP) or XP combined with Cockayne syndrome (XPCS). Mutant XPB cells from individuals with the XPCS phenotype are sensitive to UV irradiation and acute oxidative stress.

XPB helicase is also a component of the p53-mediated programmed cell death (apoptosis) pathway.

== Disorders ==
Mutations in XPB and other related complementation groups, XPA-XPG, leads to a number of genetic disorders such as Xeroderma pigmentosum, Cockayne's syndrome, and trichothiodystrophy.

== Interactions ==
XPB has been shown to interact with:

- BCR gene,
- CDK7,
- ERCC2,
- GTF2H1,
- GTF2H2,
- GTF2H4,
- GTF2H5,
- P53,
- PSMC5, and
- XPC.

== Small molecule inhibitors ==
Potent, bioactive natural products like triptolide that inhibit mammalian transcription via inhibition of the XPB subunit of the general transcription factor TFIIH has been recently reported as a glucose conjugate for targeting hypoxic cancer cells with increased glucose transporter expression.

== See also ==
- XP
