= XPD =

Espionage novel by Len Deighton

- First edition hardbound cover image
- Author: Len Deighton
- Language: English
- Genre: Spy, historical fiction
- Published: Hutchinson (UK); Knopf (US)
- Publication date: 1981
- Publication place: United Kingdom
- Media type: Book
- Pages: 339
- ISBN: 9780394512587
- OCLC: 7177002

XPD is a spy novel by Len Deighton, published in 1981, and set in 1979, roughly contemporaneous with the time it was written.

It concerns a plan by a group of former SS officers to seize power in West Germany, in which they intend to publish some wartime documents about a (fictional) secret meeting between Winston Churchill and Adolf Hitler in June 1940, and the efforts of a British agent, Boyd Stuart, to prevent the documents becoming public.

The title is the code used by the Secret Intelligence Service in the novel to refer to assassinations it carries out, short for "expedient demise".

The novel was dramatised in eight parts by Michael Bakewell for BBC radio in 1985.
