= DNA-(apurinic or apyrimidinic site) lyase =

Class of enzymes

Identifiers
- EC no.: 4.2.99.18
- CAS no.: 61811-29-8

Databases
- BRENDA: enzyme data
- ExPASy: NiceZyme view
- KEGG: enzyme entry
- MetaCyc: metabolic pathway
- Rhea: reactions
- PDB structures: RCSB PDB PDBe PDBsum
- Gene Ontology: AmiGO / QuickGO
Search
- PMC: articles
- PubMed: articles
- NCBI: proteins

The enzyme DNA-(apurinic or apyrimidinic site) lyase, also referred to as DNA-(apurinic or apyrimidinic site) 5'-phosphomonoester-lyase (systematic name) or DNA AP lyase (EC 4.2.99.18) catalyzes the cleavage of the C-O-P bond 3' from the apurinic or apyrimidinic site in DNA via β-elimination reaction, leaving a 3'-terminal unsaturated sugar and a product with a terminal 5'-phosphate. In the 1970s, this class of enzyme was found to repair at apurinic or apyrimidinic DNA sites in E. coli and in mammalian cells. The major active enzyme of this class in bacteria, and specifically, E. coli is endonuclease type III. This enzyme is part of a family of lyases that cleave carbon-oxygen bonds.

Other names for DNA AP lyase include: AP lyase; AP endonuclease class I; endodeoxyribonuclease (apurinic or apyrimidinic); deoxyribonuclease (apurinic or apyrimidinic); E. coli endonuclease III; phage-T4 UV endonuclease; Micrococcus luteus UV endonuclease; AP site-DNA 5'-phosphomonoester-lyase; and X-ray endonuclease III.

== Structural studies ==
Since DNA AP lyase is a class of structures who have numerous target genes that encode for different variations of the enzyme, there is no one single enzyme structure that can be used as an example that encompasses all versions of the enzyme. As of March 2015, 99 structures have been solved for this class of enzymes. Examples from PDB are the accession codes PDB: 1ENI, PDB: 1ENJ, PDB: 1ENK, PDB: 1K3W, PDB: 1K3X, PDB: 1K82, PDB: 1N39, PDB: 1N3A, PDB: 1N3C, PDB: 1VAS, PDB: 1XG7, PDB: 1XQO, PDB: 1XQP, PDB: 2ABK, PDB: 1EA0, PDB: 2I5W, PDB: 2J63, PDB: 2NOB, PDB: 2NOE, PDB: 2NOF, PDB: 2NOH, PDB: 2NOI, PDB: 2NOL, PDB: 2NOZ, PDB: 2OPF, PDB: 3TWK, PDB: 3TWL, PDB: 3TWM, PDB: 4PII, and PDB: 7Z5A.

== Mechanism ==
AP lyase enzymes catalyze reactions analogous to β-elimination reaction. Initially, AP hydrolyses, such as apurinic or apyrimidinic endonuclease I contain a Mg^{2+} active site that cleaves the DNA on the 5'-side, yielding a 5'-deoxyribosephosphate and 3'-OH. An AP site in DNA appears when the glycosylic bond that connects the purine or pyrimidine base to the deoxyribose sugar is cleaved. This reaction is referred to as depurination or depyrimidination. The sugar at the AP site is a highly unstable cyclic carboxonium ion that undergoes rapid hydrolysis to yield a diastereomeric mixture of 2-deoxy-α-Dribose and 2-deoxy-β-D-ribose. AP lyase enzymes could be trapped on both pre-incised and unincised AP DNA by a reducing agent such as sodium borohydride. Furthermore, the catalytic mechanism of AP lyases, the β-elimination reaction, proceeds through an imine enzyme–DNA intermediate.

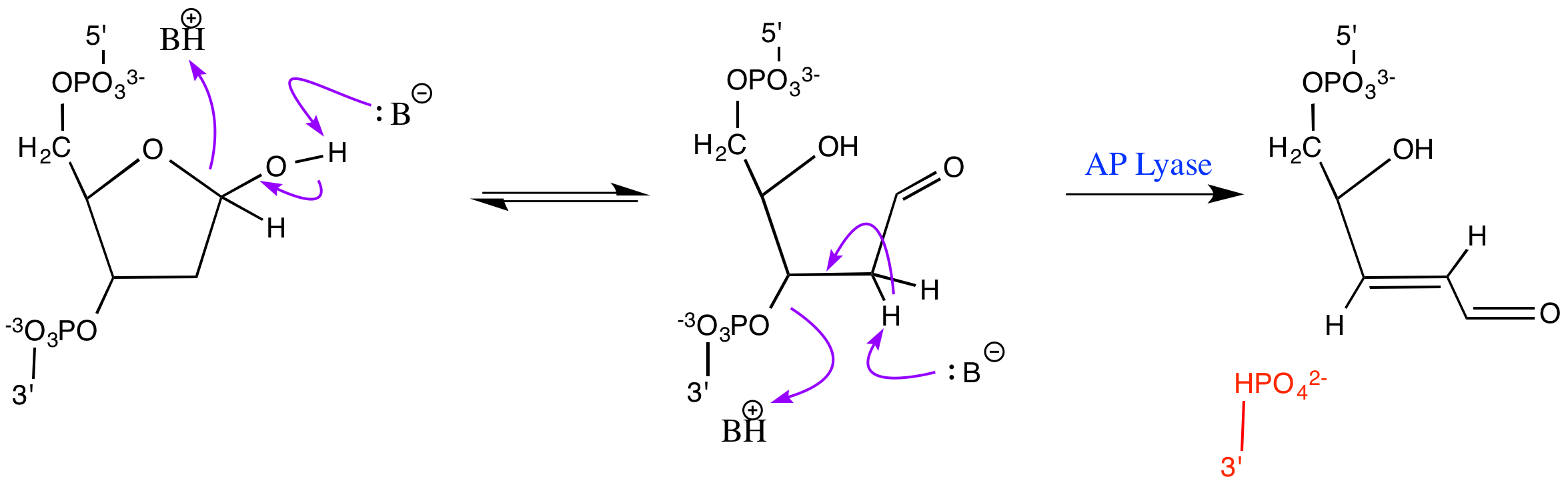
AP lyase mechanism. AP lyase, in blue, catalyzes the second reaction.

== Biological function ==
In E. coli, DNA AP lyase (endonuclease III) helps repair oxidative damage to DNA bases by catalyzing the excision of the damaged pyrimidines and purines from ring saturation or opening from the DNA backbone. This damage can be caused by non-enzymatic hydrolysis, and/or exposure to ionizing radiation.

Both UV endonuclease V from bacteriophage T4 (UV endonuclease V) and UV endonuclease III from E. coli catalyze N- glycosylase and the 3'-abasic endonuclease reactions. Bacteriophage T4 and Micrococcus luteus UV endonucleases were actually shown not to be under the class of "endonuclease," but rather were β-elimination catalysts for reactions at AP sites at the C_{3'}-O-P bond—thus, classifying them as AP lyases. Phage-T4 UV endonucleases also catalyze the reaction of the δ-reaction, nicking C_{5'}-O-P bond at AP sites, although this reaction is slow and the enzyme should still be classified as AP lyase. This open ring allows the substitution of the correct base by other enzymes.

DNA AP lyase activity is documented to have similar function in both E. Coli and in humans. A homolog of endonuclease III, human endonuclease III homolog 1, or hNTH1 functions similarly in humans as its homolog does in E. Coli.

== Disease relevance ==
DNA damage is ubiquitous amongst all forms of life. There is an estimated 1 × 10^{−4} to 1 × 10^{−6} mutations per human gamete, which follows to finding at least one mutation at a specific locus per one million gametes. DNA is the only biologic molecule that relies solely on repair of existing molecules, and is the largest molecule that can continue to function albeit numerous mutations; thus, mutations accumulate over time. However without this repair, conditions such as UV-sensitive syndrome, xeroderma pigmentosum, and Cockayne syndrome may arise.

=== Examples ===
The least severe of the three, people suffering from UV-sensitive syndrome experience UV-hypersensitivity. The syndrome arises from a mutation in the UVSSA. Unlike other severe conditions involving skin cancers and significantly reduced lifespan, this condition may result in freckles, and other skin blemishes, but does not increase likelihood of attracting a skin cancer. This condition is so rare that it has been documented to occur in seven individuals worldwide. However, it is speculated that this condition is understudied, and there are, in fact, more individuals living with the syndrome.

Xeroderma pigmentosum or XP is a rare genetic disorder that occurs worldwide. On affected people, exposure to UV radiation, especially from the sun is limited and solar pigmentations and xerosis occur. The affected may lose eyebrows, become bloodshot in the eyes, and in extreme, untreated cases, may result in extreme photo-damage resulting in skin cancers and decreased lifespan due to metastatic melanoma and squamous cell carcinoma. However, some studies report that experimental treatments with repair enzyme T4 endonuclease V and oral isotretinoin may be useful in preventing skin cancer acquired from the disorder.

If transcription-coupled repair is lost, it has little effect on mutagenesis; however, this has severe implications on progeroid syndromes, especially in genes encoding CSA and CSB proteins. Mutations in these genes cause Cockayne Syndrome, which is characterized by early cessation of growth and development, leading to severe and progressive neurodysfunction associated with demyelination, sensorineural hearing loss, cataracts, cachexia, and frailty. The average lifespan of patients with the disease is 12 years. For CS Type II patients who have little neural growth after birth, the lifespan is significantly decreased to 7 years after birth. This condition can occur alongside xeroderma pigmentosum, resulting in xeroderma pigmentosum-cockayne syndrome (XP-CS).

== See also ==
- OGG1
- NEIL1
- NEIL2
- Endonuclease
- AP endonuclease
