= NEIL3 =

Protein-coding gene in the species Homo sapiens

Identifiers
- Aliases: NEIL3, FGP2, FPG2, NEI3, ZGRF3, hFPG2, hNEI3, nei like DNA glycosylase 3
- External IDs: OMIM: 608934; MGI: 2384588; GeneCards: NEIL3
Enzyme activity
EC #	BRENDA	ExPASy	KEGG	MetaCyc
4.2.99.18	↗	↗	↗	↗

Gene location (Human)
Chr.	Chromosome 4 (human)
Band	4q34.3	Start	177,309,874 bp
Band	4q34.3	End	177,362,936 bp

Gene location (Mouse)
Chr.	Chromosome 8 (mouse)
Band	8|8 B1.3	Start	54,039,902 bp
Band	8|8 B1.3	End	54,092,100 bp
RNA expression pattern
Bgee	Human / Mouse (ortholog); Top expressed in: gonad; ventricular zone; testicle; secondary oocyte; ganglionic eminence; stromal cell of endometrium; bone marrow; pancreatic ductal cell; bone marrow cell; rectum / Top expressed in: zygote; secondary oocyte; primary oocyte; thymus; genital tubercle; spermatid; tail of embryo; tibiofemoral joint; fetal liver hematopoietic progenitor cell; granulocyte; More reference expression data
BioGPS	n/a
Gene ontology
Molecular function	DNA binding; zinc ion binding; hydrolase activity, hydrolyzing N-glycosyl compounds; metal ion binding; hydrolase activity, acting on glycosyl bonds; damaged DNA binding; catalytic activity; lyase activity; nucleic acid binding; hydrolase activity; DNA N-glycosylase activity; bubble DNA binding; DNA-(apurinic or apyrimidinic site) endonuclease activity; single-stranded DNA binding; double-stranded DNA binding; class I DNA-(apurinic or apyrimidinic site) endonuclease activity
Cellular component	nucleoplasm; nucleus
Biological process	nucleotide-excision repair; cellular response to DNA damage stimulus; metabolism; DNA repair; base-excision repair
Sources:Amigo / QuickGO
Orthologs
Databases	NCBI: entry; OMA: entry
Species	Human	Mouse
Entrez	55247	234258
Ensembl	ENSG00000109674	ENSMUSG00000039396
UniProt	Q8TAT5	Q8K203
RefSeq (mRNA)	NM_018248	NM_146208
RefSeq (protein)	NP_060718	NP_666320
Location (UCSC)	Chr 4: 177.31 – 177.36 Mb	Chr 8: 54.04 – 54.09 Mb
PubMed search
- Wikidata
View/Edit Human	View/Edit Mouse

Nei endonuclease VIII-like 3 (E. coli) is a protein in humans that is encoded by the NEIL3 gene.

NEIL3 belongs to a class of DNA glycosylases homologous to the bacterial Fpg/Nei family. These glycosylases initiate the first step in base excision repair by cleaving bases damaged by reactive oxygen species and introducing a DNA strand break via the associated lyase reaction.

== See also ==
- OGG1
- NTHL1
- NEIL1
- NEIL2
