= Cytosine glycol =

Names
- IUPAC name 4-Amino-5,6-dihydroxy-5,6-dihydro-2(1H)-pyrimidinone
- Other names 5,6-Dihydroxy-5,6-dihydrocytosine

Identifiers
CAS Number	13484-98-5
3D model (JSmol)	Interactive image
ChEBI	CHEBI:29127
ChemSpider	145962
PubChem CID	166830
CompTox Dashboard (EPA)	DTXSID60928776
- InChI: InChI=1S/C4H7N3O3/c5-2-1(8)3(9)7-4(10)6-2/h1,3,8-9H,(H3,5,6,7,10) COPY Key: KJFJEAILAVCIQJ-UHFFFAOYSA-N
- SMILES: C1(C(NC(=O)N=C1N)O)O

Properties
Chemical formula	C_{4}H_{7}N_{3}O_{3}
Molar mass	145.118 g·mol^{−1}
- Except where otherwise noted, data are given for materials in their standard state (at 25 °C [77 °F], 100 kPa). Infobox references

Cytosine glycols are intermediate unstable products of cytosine oxidation. These, in turn, are thought to undergo deamination to uracil glycol, dehydration to 5-hydroxycytosine, or both deamination and dehydration to 5-hydroxyuracil. Its name indicates its major structural nature: a glycol derivative of cytosine, as the apparent 1,2-dihydroxylation of its alkene region.

The lifetime of cytosine glycols are enhanced in double-stranded DNA compared to the free nucleoside.
