= NTHL1 =

Protein-coding gene in the species Homo sapiens

Identifiers
- Aliases: NTHL1, NTH1, OCTS3, hNTH1, FAP3, nth-like DNA glycosylase 1, nth like DNA glycosylase 1
- External IDs: OMIM: 602656; MGI: 1313275; GeneCards: NTHL1
Enzyme activity
EC #	BRENDA	ExPASy	KEGG	MetaCyc
4.2.99.18	↗	↗	↗	↗

Gene location (Human)
Chr.	Chromosome 16 (human)
Band	16p13.3	Start	2,039,815 bp
Band	16p13.3	End	2,047,866 bp

Gene location (Mouse)
Chr.	Chromosome 17 (mouse)
Band	17|17 A3.3	Start	24,851,654 bp
Band	17|17 A3.3	End	24,857,811 bp
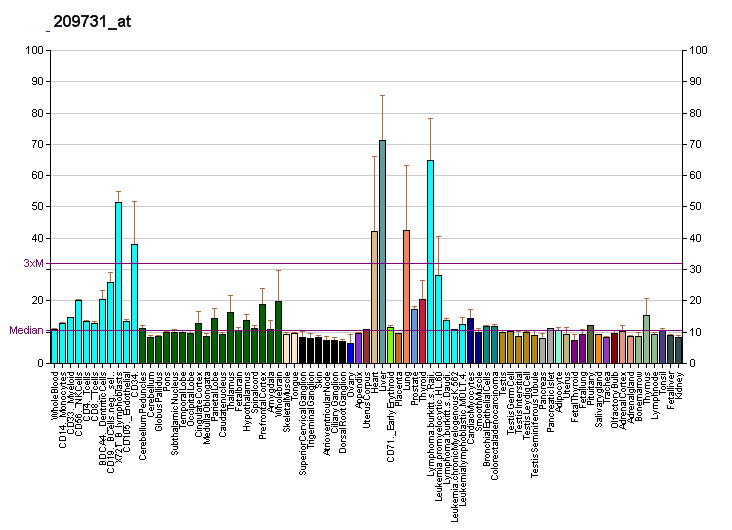
RNA expression pattern
Bgee	Human / Mouse (ortholog); Top expressed in: right lobe of liver; apex of heart; mucosa of transverse colon; right uterine tube; putamen; right hemisphere of cerebellum; gonad; nucleus accumbens; caudate nucleus; right frontal lobe / Top expressed in: blastocyst; embryo; zygote; morula; embryo; primary oocyte; yolk sac; epiblast; secondary oocyte; right kidney; More reference expression data
BioGPS	More reference expression data
Gene ontology
Molecular function	lyase activity; protein binding; catalytic activity; endonuclease activity; double-stranded DNA binding; hydrolase activity, acting on glycosyl bonds; hydrolase activity; DNA binding; iron-sulfur cluster binding; metal ion binding; 4 iron, 4 sulfur cluster binding; DNA N-glycosylase activity; DNA-(apurinic or apyrimidinic site) endonuclease activity; oxidized purine nucleobase lesion DNA N-glycosylase activity; oxidized pyrimidine nucleobase lesion DNA N-glycosylase activity; class I DNA-(apurinic or apyrimidinic site) endonuclease activity
Cellular component	nucleoplasm; nucleus; mitochondrion
Biological process	depyrimidination; cellular response to DNA damage stimulus; metabolism; nucleotide-excision repair, DNA incision, 5'-to lesion; DNA repair; base-excision repair; base-excision repair, AP site formation
Sources:Amigo / QuickGO
Orthologs
Databases	NCBI: entry; OMA: entry
Species	Human	Mouse
Entrez	4913	18207
Ensembl	ENSG00000065057	ENSMUSG00000041429
UniProt	P78549	O35980
RefSeq (mRNA)	NM_002528; NM_001318193; NM_001318194	NM_008743; NM_001357615
RefSeq (protein)	NP_001305122; NP_001305123; NP_002519	NP_032769; NP_001344544
Location (UCSC)	Chr 16: 2.04 – 2.05 Mb	Chr 17: 24.85 – 24.86 Mb
PubMed search
- Wikidata
View/Edit Human	View/Edit Mouse

Endonuclease III-like protein 1 is an enzyme that in humans is encoded by the NTHL1 gene.

As reviewed by Li et al., NTHL1 is a bifunctional DNA glycosylase that has an associated beta-elimination activity. NTHL1 is usually involved in removing oxidative pyrimidine lesions through base excision repair. NTHL1 catalyses the first step in base excision repair. It cleaves the N-glycosylic bond between the damaged base and its associated sugar residue and then cleaves the phosphodiester bond 3' to the AP site, leaving a 3'-unsaturated aldehyde after beta-elimination and a 5'-phosphate at the termini of the repair gap.

Low expression of NTHL1 is associated with initiation and development of astrocytoma. Low expression of NTHL1 is also found in follicular thyroid tumors.

A germ line homozygous mutation in NTHL1 causes a cancer susceptibility syndrome similar to Lynch syndrome.

== See also ==
- OGG1
- NEIL1
- NEIL2
- NEIL3
