= 2-hydroxy-dATP diphosphatase =

Class of enzymes

Identifiers
- EC no.: 3.6.1.56

Databases
- BRENDA: enzyme data
- ExPASy: NiceZyme view
- KEGG: enzyme entry
- MetaCyc: metabolic pathway
- Rhea: reactions
- PDB structures: RCSB PDB PDBe PDBsum
Search
- PMC: articles
- PubMed: articles
- NCBI: proteins

NUDT1

Identifiers
- Aliases: NUDT1, MTH1, nudix hydrolase 1, human MutT homolog 1 (hMTH1), 8-oxo-dGTPase, 7,8-dihydro-8-oxoguanine triphosphatase, 8-oxoguanine DNA glycolase
- External IDs: OMIM: 600312; MGI: 109280; GeneCards: NUDT1
Available structures
PDB	Ortholog search: PDBe RCSB
PDB	List of PDB id codes 1IRY, 3Q93, 3WHW, 3ZR0, 3ZR1, 4C9W, 4C9X, 4N1T, 4N1U, 5ANS, 5ANW, 5ANV, 5ANU, 5ANT, 5FSN, 5FSI
Enzyme activity
EC #	BRENDA	ExPASy	KEGG	MetaCyc
3.6.1.56	↗	↗	↗	↗

Gene location (Human)
Chr.	Chromosome 7 (human)
Band	7p22.3	Start	2,242,226 bp
Band	7p22.3	End	2,251,146 bp

Gene location (Mouse)
Chr.	Chromosome 5 (mouse)
Band	5|5 G2	Start	140,307,411 bp
Band	5|5 G2	End	140,323,892 bp
RNA expression pattern
Bgee	Human / Mouse (ortholog); Top expressed in: gonad; right testis; left testis; ganglionic eminence; ventricular zone; granulocyte; periodontal fiber; mucosa of transverse colon; monocyte; stromal cell of endometrium / Top expressed in: otic placode; saccule; otic vesicle; primitive streak; left lobe of liver; yolk sac; Paneth cell; epiblast; morula; endothelial cell of lymphatic vessel; More reference expression data
BioGPS	More reference expression data
Gene ontology
Molecular function	m7G(5')pppN diphosphatase activity; ATP diphosphatase activity; 8-oxo-7,8-dihydroguanosine triphosphate pyrophosphatase activity; metal ion binding; protein binding; RNA binding; hydrolase activity; GTP diphosphatase activity; snoRNA binding; 8-oxo-7,8-dihydrodeoxyguanosine triphosphate pyrophosphatase activity; GTPase activity
Cellular component	cytoplasm; mitochondrial matrix; mitochondrion; nucleus; nuclear membrane; plasma membrane; acrosomal vesicle; extracellular space; cytosol
Biological process	nucleobase-containing small molecule catabolic process; dATP catabolic process; purine nucleotide catabolic process; DNA protection; response to oxidative stress; dGTP catabolic process; DNA repair; response to cadmium ion; ageing; male gonad development
Sources:Amigo / QuickGO
Orthologs
Databases	NCBI: entry; OMA: entry
Species	Human	Mouse
Entrez	4521	17766
Ensembl	ENSG00000106268	ENSMUSG00000036639
UniProt	P36639	P53368
RefSeq (mRNA)	NM_198954; NM_002452; NM_198948; NM_198949; NM_198950 NM_198952; NM_198953; NM_001367553; NM_001367554; NM_001367555	NM_008637; NM_001356583; NM_001356584; NM_001356585
RefSeq (protein)	NP_002443; NP_945186; NP_945187; NP_945188; NP_945190 NP_945191; NP_945192; NP_001354482; NP_001354483; NP_001354484	NP_032663; NP_001343512; NP_001343513; NP_001343514
Location (UCSC)	Chr 7: 2.24 – 2.25 Mb	Chr 5: 140.31 – 140.32 Mb
PubMed search
- Wikidata
View/Edit Human	View/Edit Mouse

2-hydroxy-dATP diphosphatase (EC 3.6.1.56, also known as oxidized purine nucleoside triphosphatase, or (2'-deoxy) ribonucleoside 5'-triphosphate pyrophosphohydrolase, or Nudix hydrolase 1 (NUDT1), or MutT homolog 1 (MTH1), or 7,8-dihydro-8-oxoguanine triphosphatase) is an enzyme that in humans is encoded by the NUDT1 gene. During DNA repair, the enzyme hydrolyses oxidized purines and prevents their addition onto the DNA chain. As such it has important role in aging and cancer development.

== Function ==
This enzyme catalyses the following chemical reaction

2-hydroxy-dATP + H_{2}O $\rightleftharpoons$ 2-hydroxy-dAMP + diphosphate

The enzyme hydrolyses oxidized purine nucleoside triphosphates. The enzyme is used in DNA repair, where it hydrolysis the oxidized purines and prevents their addition onto the DNA chain.

Misincorporation of oxidized nucleoside triphosphates into DNA and/or RNA during replication and transcription can cause mutations that may result in carcinogenesis or neurodegeneration. First isolated from Escherichia coli because of its ability to prevent occurrence of 8-oxoguanine in DNA, the protein encoded by this gene is an enzyme that hydrolyzes oxidized purine nucleoside triphosphates, such as 8-oxo-dGTP, 8-oxo-dATP, 2-oxo-dATP, 2-hydroxy-dATP, and 2-hydroxy rATP, to monophosphates, thereby preventing misincorporation.

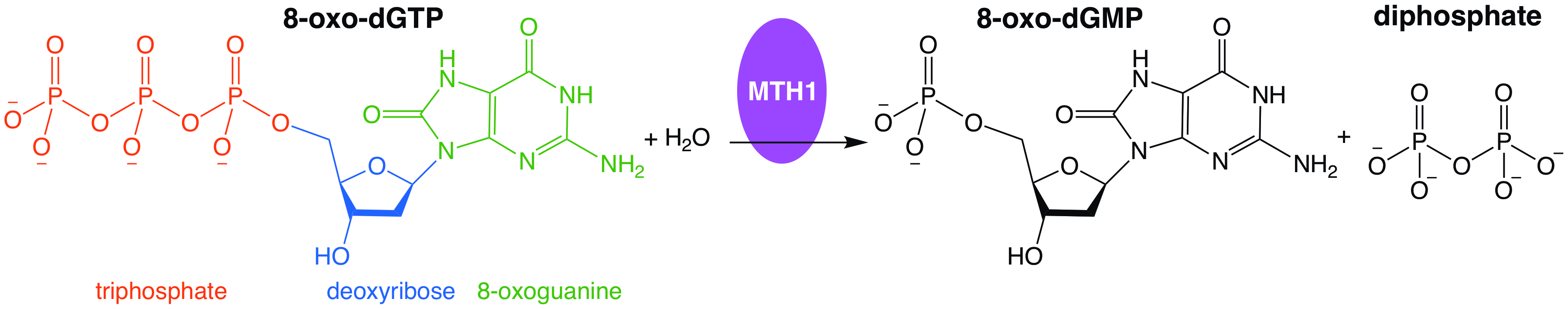
Example hydrolysis of oxidized nucleotide catalyzed by MTH1

MutT enzymes in non-human organisms often have substrate specificity for certain types of oxidized nucleotides, such as that of E. coli, which is specific to 8-oxoguanine nucleotides. Human MTH1, however, has substrate specificity for a much broader range of oxidatively damaged nucleotides. The mechanism of hMTH1's broad specificity for these oxidized nucleotides is derived from their recognition in the enzyme's substrate binding pocket due to an exchange of protonation state between two nearby aspartate residues.

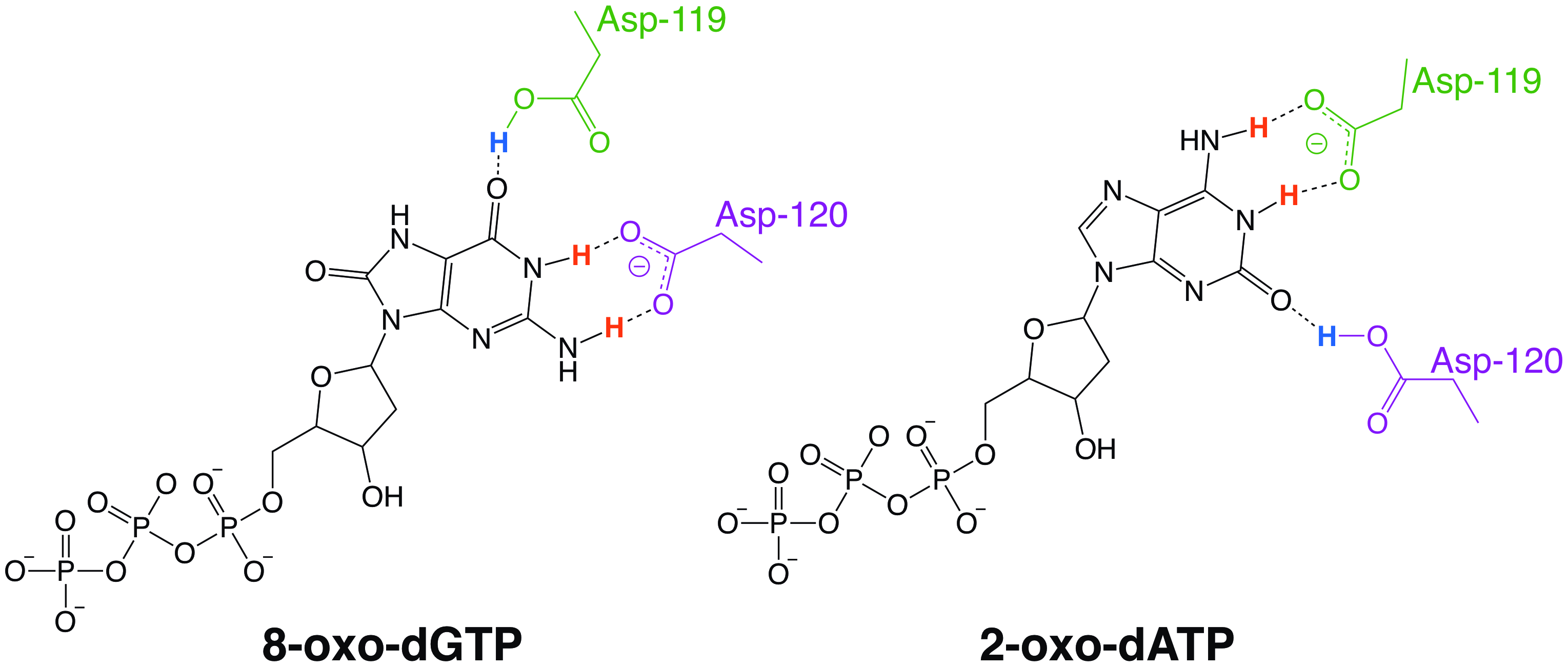
Examples of the protonation state exchange between MTH1 residues Asp-119 and Asp-120 that allows the enzyme to recognize oxidized nucleotides.

The encoded protein is localized mainly in the cytoplasm, with some in the mitochondria, suggesting that it is involved in the sanitization of nucleotide pools both for nuclear and mitochondrial genomes. In plants, MTH1 has also been shown to enhance resistance to heat- and paraquat-induced oxidative stress, resulting in fewer dead cells and less accumulation of hydrogen peroxide.

Several alternatively spliced transcript variants, some of which encode distinct isoforms, have been identified. Additional variants have been observed, but their full-length natures have not been determined. A single-nucleotide polymorphism that results in the production of an additional, longer isoform has been described.

== Research ==
=== Aging ===
A mouse model has been studied that over-expresses hMTH1-Tg (NUDT1). The hMTH1-Tg mice express high levels of the hMTH1 hydrolase that degrades 8-oxodGTP and 8-oxoGTP and therefore excludes 8-oxoguanine from DNA and RNA. The steady state levels of 8-oxoguanine in DNA of several organs including the brain are significantly reduced in hMTH1-Tg over-expressing mice. Conversely, MTH1-null mice exhibit a significantly higher level of 8-oxo-dGTP accumulation than that of the wild type. Over-expression of hMTH1 prevents the age-dependent accumulation of DNA 8-oxoguanine that occurs in wild-type mice. The lower levels of oxidized guanines are associated with greater longevity. The hMTH1-Tg animals have a significantly longer lifespan than their wild-type littermates. These findings provide a link between ageing and oxidative DNA damage (see DNA damage theory of aging).

=== Cancer ===
Studies have suggested that this enzyme plays a role in both preventing the formation of cancer cells and the proliferation of cancer cells. This makes it a topic of interest in cancer research, both as a potential method for healthy cells to prevent cancer and a weakness to target within existing cancer cells.

Eliminating the MTH1 gene in mice results in over three times more mice developing tumors compared to a control group. The enzyme's much-studied ability to sanitize a cell's nucleotide pool prevents it from developing mutations, including cancerous ones. Specifically, another study found that MTH1 inhibition in cancer cells leads to incorporation of 8-oxo-dGTP and other oxidatively damaged nucleotides into the cell's DNA, damaging it and causing cell death. However, cancer cells have also been shown to benefit from use of MTH1. Cells from malignant breast tumors exhibit extreme MTH1 expression compared to other human cells. Because a cancer cell divides much more rapidly than a normal human cell, it is far more in need of an enzyme like MTH1 that prevents fatal mutations during replication. This property of cancer cells could allow for monitoring of cancer treatment efficacy by measuring MTH1 expression. Development of suitable probes for this purpose is currently underway.

Disagreement exists concerning MTH1's functionality relative to prevention of DNA damage and cancer. Subsequent studies have had difficulty reproducing previously reported cytotoxic or antiproliferation effects of MTH1 inhibition on cancer cells, even calling into question whether MTH1 truly does serve to remove oxidatively damaged nucleotides from a cell's nucleotide pool. One study of newly discovered MTH1 inhibitors suggests that these anticancer properties exhibited by the older MTH1 inhibitors may be due to off-target cytotoxic effects. After revisiting the experiment, the original authors of this claim found that while the original MTH1 inhibitors in question lead to damaged nucleotides being incorporated into DNA, they demonstrate the others that do not induce toxicity fail to introduce the DNA lesion. Research into this topic is ongoing.

=== As a drug target ===
MTH1 is a potential drug target to treat cancer, however there are conflicting results regarding the cytotoxicity of MTH1 inhibitors toward cancer cells.

Karonudib, an MTH1 inhibitor, is currently being evaluated a phase I clinical trial for safety and tolerability.

A potent and selective MTH1 inhibitor AZ13792138 has been developed by AstraZeneca has been made available as a chemical probe to academic researchers. However AstraZeneca has found that neither AZ13792138 nor genetic knockdown of MTH1 displays any significant cytotoxicity to cancer cells.

== See also ==
- NUDT15
- 8-oxo-dGTP diphosphatase
