= C4H7N3O3 =

The molecular formula C_{4}H_{7}N_{3}O_{3} may refer to:

- Cytosine glycol, intermediate unstable products of cytosine oxidation
- Quisqualamine, the α-decarboxylated analogue of quisqualic acid
