= C17H21N3 =

The molecular formula C_{17}H_{21}N_{3} (molar mass: 267.376 g/mol) may refer to:

- Auramine O
- TH10785
