= CAMFAK syndrome =

- Other names: Cataract-microcephaly-arthrogryposis-kyphosis syndrome, Cataract-microcephaly-failure to thrive-kyphoscoliosis syndrome
- CAMFAK syndrome has an autosomal recessive pattern of inheritance.

CAMFAK syndrome (or CAMAK syndrome) is an acronym used to describe a rare inherited neurologic disease, characterized by peripheral and central demyelination of nerves, similar to that seen in Cockayne syndrome. The name "CAMFAK" comes from the first letters of the characteristic findings of the disease: cataracts, microcephaly, failure to thrive, and kyphoscoliosis. The disease may occur with or without failure to thrive and arthrogryposis.

== Presentation ==
Low birth weight and a bird-like face may be the first signs. Severe intellectual deficit and death within the first decade are typical.

== Genetics ==
CAMFAK syndrome is inherited in an autosomal recessive manner. This means the defective gene responsible for the disorder is located on an autosome, and two copies of the defective gene (one inherited from each parent) are required in order to be born with the disorder. The parents of an individual with an autosomal recessive disorder both carry one copy of the defective gene, but usually do not experience any signs or symptoms of the disorder.
