= TH10785 =

Names
- IUPAC name N-Cyclohexyl-2-cyclopropylquinazolin-4-amine

Identifiers
| 3D model (JSmol) | Interactive image |
| ChEMBL | ChEMBL5429494 |
| ChemSpider | 6381451 |
| PubChem CID | 8078523 |
- InChI: InChI=1S/C17H21N3/c1-2-6-13(7-3-1)18-17-14-8-4-5-9-15(14)19-16(20-17)12-10-11-12/h4-5,8-9,12-13H,1-3,6-7,10-11H2,(H,18,19,20) Key: ZQMGQZOHIDOPCQ-UHFFFAOYSA-N
- SMILES: C1CCC(CC1)NC2=NC(=NC3=CC=CC=C32)C4CC4

Properties
| Chemical formula | C_{17}H_{21}N_{3} |
| Molar mass | 267.376 g·mol^{−1} |
- Except where otherwise noted, data are given for materials in their standard state (at 25 °C [77 °F], 100 kPa). Infobox references

TH10785 is a small molecule that increases OGG1 recruitment and repair of oxidative DNA damage, catalyzing a biochemical reaction not seen in the native protein.
