= DCLRE1A =

Protein-coding gene in the species Homo sapiens

Identifiers
- Aliases: DCLRE1A, PSO2, SNM1, SNM1A, DNA cross-link repair 1A
- External IDs: OMIM: 609682; MGI: 1930042; GeneCards: DCLRE1A
Available structures
PDB	Ortholog search: PDBe RCSB
PDB	List of PDB id codes 4B87, 5AHR
Enzyme activity
EC #	BRENDA	ExPASy	KEGG	MetaCyc
3.5.2.6	↗	↗	↗	↗

Gene location (Human)
Chr.	Chromosome 10 (human)
Band	10q25.3	Start	113,834,725 bp
Band	10q25.3	End	113,854,383 bp

Gene location (Mouse)
Chr.	Chromosome 19 (mouse)
Band	19|19 D2	Start	56,517,599 bp
Band	19|19 D2	End	56,536,675 bp
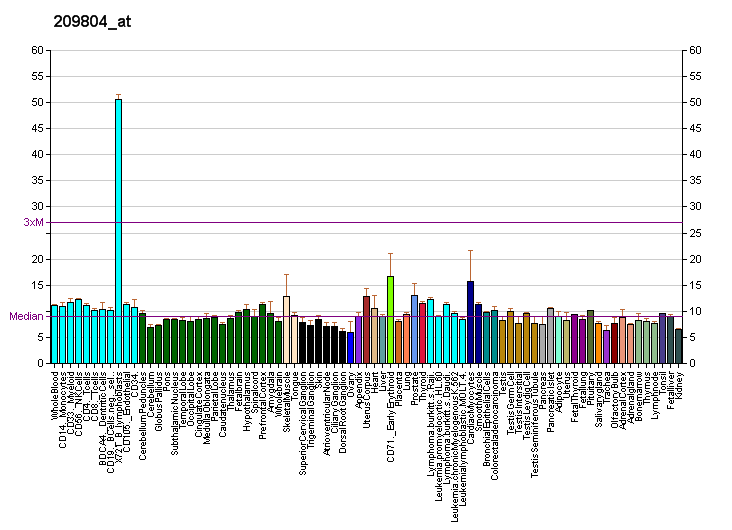
RNA expression pattern
Bgee	Human / Mouse (ortholog); Top expressed in: secondary oocyte; gonad; testicle; ventricular zone; ganglionic eminence; tendon of biceps brachii; islet of Langerhans; germinal epithelium; epithelium of nasopharynx; mononuclear cell / Top expressed in: secondary oocyte; primary oocyte; zygote; tail of embryo; genital tubercle; fetal liver hematopoietic progenitor cell; spermatocyte; left lobe of liver; lumbar subsegment of spinal cord; morula; More reference expression data
BioGPS	More reference expression data
Gene ontology
Molecular function	5'-3' exodeoxyribonuclease activity; damaged DNA binding
Cellular component	fibrillar center; nucleus; nucleoplasm
Biological process	cellular response to DNA damage stimulus; cell cycle; double-strand break repair via nonhomologous end joining; interstrand cross-link repair; protection from non-homologous end joining at telomere; cell division; nucleic acid phosphodiester bond hydrolysis; DNA repair
Sources:Amigo / QuickGO
Orthologs
Databases	NCBI: entry; OMA: entry
Species	Human	Mouse
Entrez	9937	55947
Ensembl	ENSG00000198924	ENSMUSG00000025077
UniProt	Q6PJP8	Q9JIC3
RefSeq (mRNA)	NM_001271816; NM_014881	NM_018831; NM_001360437; NM_001360438; NM_001360439
RefSeq (protein)	NP_001258745; NP_055696	n/a
Location (UCSC)	Chr 10: 113.83 – 113.85 Mb	Chr 19: 56.52 – 56.54 Mb
PubMed search
- Wikidata
View/Edit Human	View/Edit Mouse

DNA cross-link repair 1A protein is a protein that in humans is encoded by the DCLRE1A gene.

DNA interstrand cross-links prevent strand separation, thereby physically blocking transcription, replication, and segregation of DNA. DCLRE1A is one of several evolutionarily conserved genes involved in repair of interstrand cross-links (Dronkert et al., 2000).[supplied by OMIM]

== Function ==
The protein DCLRE1A (DNA cross-link repair 1A) is also referred to as SNM1A (sensitive to nitrogen mustard 1A). DCLRE1A is a 5’ to 3’ exonuclease that forms a complex with the Cockayne syndrome B (CSB) protein. In this complex, CSB modulates the exonuclease activity of DCLRE1A and coordinates the efficient assembly of DCLRE1A to sites of DNA damage. In human cells, this complex is recruited to DNA inter-strand cross-links, a form of DNA damage. The complex then participates in the repair of the cross-linked DNA. DCLRE1A protein is thought to be recruited by CSB to facilitate cross-link unhooking following incision 5’ to the cross-link by another complex, the ERCC1/XPF nuclease complex. Failure of the DCLRE1A/CSB complex to carry out its repair function may contribute to the degenerative pathologies and premature aging features of Cockayne syndrome.
