= UVSSA =

Protein-coding gene in the species Homo sapiens

Identifiers
- Aliases: UVSSA, KIAA1530, UVSS3, UV stimulated scaffold protein A
- External IDs: OMIM: 614632; MGI: 1918351; HomoloGene: 13807; GeneCards: UVSSA; OMA:UVSSA - orthologs

Gene location (Human)
| Chr. | Chromosome 4 (human) |
| Band | 4p16.3 | Start | 1,345,691 bp |
| Band | 4p16.3 | End | 1,395,989 bp |

Gene location (Mouse)
| Chr. | Chromosome 5 (mouse) |
| Band | 5|5 B1 | Start | 33,535,893 bp |
| Band | 5|5 B1 | End | 33,577,098 bp |
RNA expression pattern
| Bgee | Human / Mouse (ortholog); Top expressed in: pancreatic ductal cell; corpus epididymis; caput epididymis; mucosa of ileum; tail of epididymis; buccal mucosa cell; right uterine tube; sperm; skin of arm; tibia / Top expressed in: hand; lumbar subsegment of spinal cord; ciliary body; prostate; pituitary gland; lobe of prostate; vas deferens; retinal pigment epithelium; mesenteric lymph nodes; skin of external ear; More reference expression data |
| BioGPS | n/a |
Gene ontology
| Molecular function | RNA polymerase II complex binding; protein binding |
| Cellular component | nucleoplasm; chromosome |
| Biological process | transcription-coupled nucleotide-excision repair; response to UV; protein ubiquitination; cellular response to DNA damage stimulus; DNA repair |
Sources:Amigo / QuickGO
Orthologs
| Species | Human | Mouse |
| Entrez | 57654 | 71101 |
| Ensembl | ENSG00000163945 | ENSMUSG00000037355 |
| UniProt | Q2YD98 | Q9D479 |
| RefSeq (mRNA) | NM_020894; NM_001317934; NM_001317935 | NM_001081101; NM_027674 |
| RefSeq (protein) | NP_001304863; NP_001304864; NP_065945 | NP_001074570; NP_081950 |
| Location (UCSC) | Chr 4: 1.35 – 1.4 Mb | Chr 5: 33.54 – 33.58 Mb |
| PubMed search |
- Wikidata
| View/Edit Human | View/Edit Mouse |

UV-stimulated scaffold protein A is a protein that in humans that is encoded by the UVSSA gene (previously KIAA1530). This protein is involved in DNA repair in response to UV radiation damage. In particular, it interacts with nucleotide excision repair proteins (specifically TC-NER subunits) along with RNA polymerase II subunits that have stalled.

Mutations in this gene have been identified to cause the UV-sensitive syndrome and recently, its important role in Transcription-coupled repair has been identified.

== Clinical relevance ==
Mutations in this gene cause UV-sensitive syndrome.
