= NEIL2 =

Gene of the species Homo sapiens

Identifiers
- Aliases: NEIL2, NEH2, NEI2, nei like DNA glycosylase 2
- External IDs: OMIM: 608933; MGI: 2686058; GeneCards: NEIL2
Available structures
PDB	Ortholog search: PDBe RCSB
PDB	List of PDB id codes 1VZP
Enzyme activity
EC #	BRENDA	ExPASy	KEGG	MetaCyc
4.2.99.18	↗	↗	↗	↗

Gene location (Mouse)
Chr.	Chromosome 14 (mouse)
Band	14|14 D1	Start	63,419,892 bp
Band	14|14 D1	End	63,431,305 bp
Gene ontology
Molecular function	DNA binding; microtubule binding; zinc ion binding; hydrolase activity, hydrolyzing N-glycosyl compounds; metal ion binding; hydrolase activity, acting on glycosyl bonds; damaged DNA binding; protein binding; catalytic activity; lyase activity; nucleic acid binding; DNA-(apurinic or apyrimidinic site) endonuclease activity; hydrolase activity; DNA N-glycosylase activity; class I DNA-(apurinic or apyrimidinic site) endonuclease activity
Cellular component	cytoplasm; microtubule cytoskeleton; spindle microtubule; nucleus; nucleoplasm; intracellular membrane-bounded organelle
Biological process	nucleotide-excision repair; cellular response to DNA damage stimulus; depyrimidination; metabolism; base-excision repair; DNA repair
Sources:Amigo / QuickGO
Orthologs
Databases	NCBI: entry; OMA: entry
Species	Human	Mouse
Entrez	252969	382913
Ensembl	ENSG00000154328	ENSMUSG00000035121
UniProt	Q969S2	Q6R2P8
RefSeq (mRNA)	NM_001135746; NM_001135747; NM_001135748; NM_145043	NM_201610
RefSeq (protein)	NP_001129218; NP_001129219; NP_001129220; NP_659480; NP_001336368 NP_001336369; NP_001336370; NP_001336371	NP_963904
Location (UCSC)	n/a	Chr 14: 63.42 – 63.43 Mb
PubMed search
- Wikidata
View/Edit Human	View/Edit Mouse

Endonuclease VIII-like 2 is an enzyme that in humans is encoded by the NEIL2 gene.

NEIL2 belongs to a class of DNA glycosylases homologous to the bacterial Fpg/Nei family. These glycosylases initiate the first step in base excision repair by cleaving bases damaged by reactive oxygen species and introducing a DNA strand break via the associated lyase reaction (Bandaru et al., 2002)[supplied by OMIM]

== See also ==
- NEIL1
- NEIL3
- OGG1
- NTHL1
