= 8-oxo-dGTP diphosphatase =

Class of enzymes

Identifiers
- EC no.: 3.6.1.55

Databases
- BRENDA: enzyme data
- ExPASy: NiceZyme view
- KEGG: enzyme entry
- MetaCyc: metabolic pathway
- Rhea: reactions
- PDB structures: RCSB PDB PDBe PDBsum
Search
- PMC: articles
- PubMed: articles
- NCBI: proteins

8-oxo-dGTP diphosphatase (EC 3.6.1.55, MutT, 7,8-dihydro-8-oxoguanine triphosphatase, 8-oxo-dGTPase, 7,8-dihydro-8-oxo-dGTP pyrophosphohydrolase) is an enzyme characterised from Escherichia coli with systematic name 8-oxo-dGTP diphosphohydrolase. It catalyses the hydrolysis of 8-oxo-deoxyguanosine triphosphate (8-oxo-dGTP) to the corresponding monophosphate (8-oxo-dGMP) and pyrophosphate (PP_{i}):

8-oxo-dGTP
H_{2}O
PP_{i}
8-oxo-dGMP

This enzyme requires magnesium as Mg^{2+} and its role is to remove oxidised nucleoside triphosphates so that they cannot be mis-incorporated into DNA.
