= ERCC6 =

Gene of the species Homo sapiens

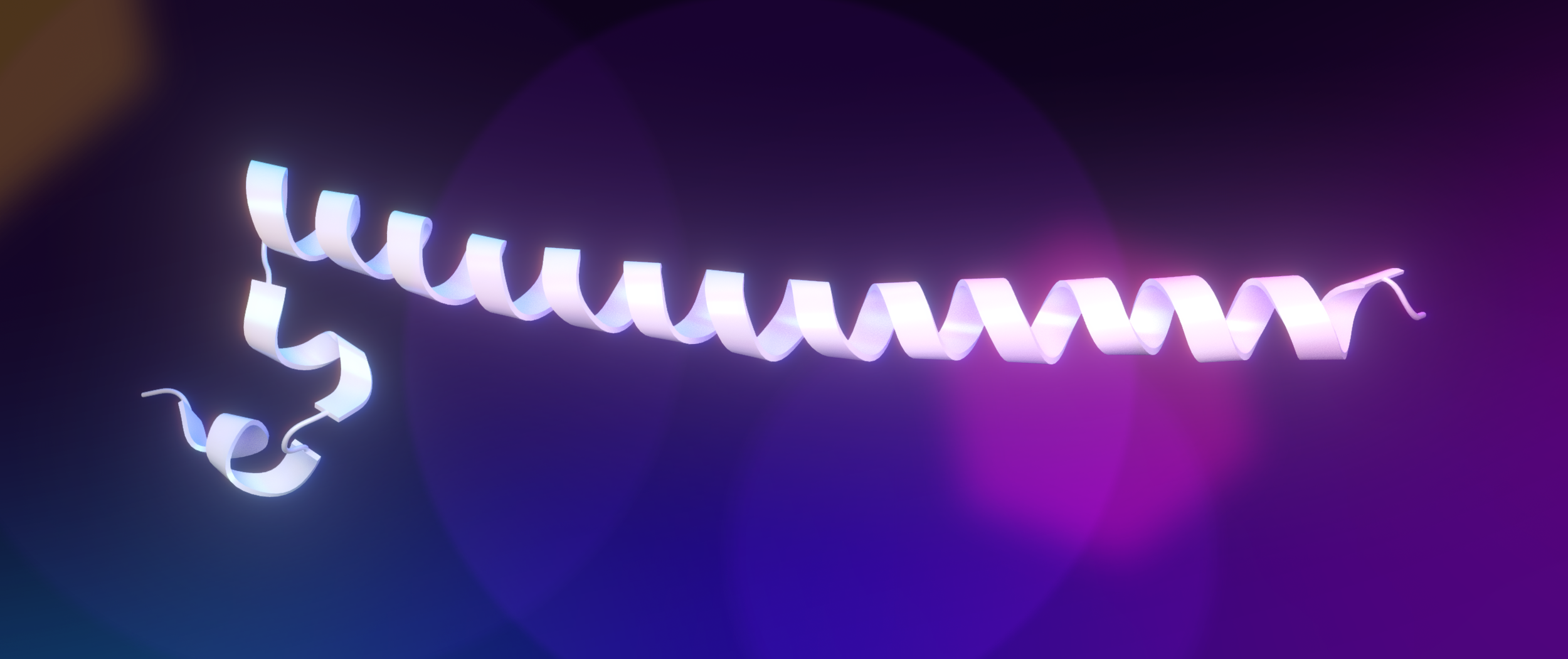

Identifiers
- Aliases: ERCC6, ARMD5, CKN2, COFS, COFS1, CSB, RAD26, UVSS1, POF11, ERCC excision repair 6, chromatin remodeling factor, excision repair cross-complementing group 6
- External IDs: OMIM: 609413; MGI: 1100494; GeneCards: ERCC6
Available structures
PDB	Ortholog search: PDBe RCSB
PDB	List of PDB id codes 4CVO

Gene location (Mouse)
Chr.	Chromosome 14 (mouse)
Band	14|14 B	Start	32,235,478 bp
Band	14|14 B	End	32,302,947 bp
Gene ontology
Molecular function	nucleotide binding; ATP-dependent activity, acting on DNA; protein tyrosine kinase activator activity; helicase activity; protein N-terminus binding; chromatin binding; DNA helicase activity; protein C-terminus binding; protein binding; hydrolase activity; DNA binding; ATP binding; RNA polymerase binding; protein-containing complex binding; sequence-specific DNA binding
Cellular component	nucleoplasm; nucleolus; transcription elongation factor complex; nucleus; nuclear body
Biological process	pyrimidine dimer repair; epigenetic maintenance of chromatin in transcription-competent conformation; response to superoxide; regulation of transcription, DNA-templated; multicellular organism growth; regulation of DNA-templated transcription, elongation; transcription by RNA polymerase II; transcription, DNA-templated; cellular response to DNA damage stimulus; positive regulation of DNA-templated transcription, elongation; transcription elongation from RNA polymerase I promoter; intrinsic apoptotic signaling pathway in response to DNA damage; response to UV-B; photoreceptor cell maintenance; response to gamma radiation; response to toxic substance; response to X-ray; base-excision repair; response to oxidative stress; positive regulation of protein tyrosine kinase activity; response to UV; transcription-coupled nucleotide-excision repair; DNA repair; DNA duplex unwinding; positive regulation of DNA repair
Sources:Amigo / QuickGO
Orthologs
Databases	NCBI: entry; OMA: entry
Species	Human	Mouse
Entrez	2074	319955
Ensembl	ENSG00000225830	ENSMUSG00000054051
UniProt	P0DP91; Q8N328	F8VPZ5
RefSeq (mRNA)	n/a	NM_001081221
RefSeq (protein)	NP_000115; NP_001263987; NP_001263988; NP_001333369; NP_736609	NP_001074690
Location (UCSC)	n/a	Chr 14: 32.24 – 32.3 Mb
PubMed search
- Wikidata
View/Edit Human	View/Edit Mouse

DNA excision repair protein ERCC-6 (also CS-B protein) is a protein that in humans is encoded by the ERCC6 gene. The ERCC6 gene is located on the long arm of chromosome 10 at position 11.23.

Having 1 or more copies of a mutated ERCC6 causes Cockayne syndrome, type II.

== Function ==
DNA can be damaged by ultraviolet radiation, toxins, radioactive substances, and reactive biochemical intermediates like free radicals. The ERCC6 protein is involved in repairing the genome when specific genes undergoing transcription (dubbed active genes) are inoperative; as such, ERCC6 serves as a transcription-coupled excision repair protein, being one of the fundamental enzymes in active gene repair.

== Structure and mechanism ==
CSB has been found to exhibit ATPase properties; there are contradictory publications regarding the effect of ATP concentration on CSB's activity. The most recent evidence suggests that ADP/AMP allosterically regulate CSB. As such, it has been speculated that CSB may promote protein complex formation at repair sites subject to the ATP to ADP charge ratio.

Conservation of helicase motifs in eukaryote CSB is evident; all seven major domains of the protein are conserved among numerous RNA and DNA helicases. Detailed structural analysis of CSB has been performed; motifs I, Ia, II, and III are collectively called domain 1, while motifs IV, V, and VI comprise domain 2. These domains wrap around an interdomain cleft involved in ATP binding and hydrolysis. Motifs III and IV are in close proximity to the active site; hence, residues in these regions stabilize ATP/ADP binding via hydrogen bonding. Domain 2 has been proposed to affect DNA binding after induced conformational changes stemming from ATP hydrolysis. Specific residues involved in gene binding have yet to be identified.

The evolutionary roots of CSB has led some to contend that it exhibits helicase activity. Evidence for the helicase properties of CSB is highly disputed; yet, it has been found the protein participates in intracellular trafficking, a traditional role of helicases. The complex interactions between DNA repair proteins suggest that eukaryote CSB upholds some but not all of the functions of its prokaryotic precursors.

== Interactions ==
CSB has been shown to interact with P53.

CSB has been shown to act as chromatin remodeling factor for RNA Polymerase II. When RNA Polymerase II is stalled by a mistake in the genome, CSB remodels the DNA double helix so as to allow access by repair enzymes to the lesion.

CSB is involved in the base excision repair (BER) pathway. This is due to demonstrated interactions with human AP endonuclease, though interactions between recombinant CSB and E. coli endonuclease IV as well as human N-terminus AP endonuclease fragments have not been observed in vitro. Specifically, CSB stimulates the AP site incision activity of AP endonuclease independent of ATP.

In addition to the BER pathway, CSB is heavily integrated in the nucleotide excision repair (NER) pathway. While BER utilizes glycosylases to recognize and correct non-bulky lesions, NER is particularly versatile in repairing DNA damaged by UV radiation via the removal of oxidized bases. CSB's role in NER is best manifested by interactions with T cell receptors, in which protein collaboration is key in effective antigen binding.

== Neurogenesis and neural differentiation ==
ERCC6 knockout within human neural progenitor cells has been shown to decrease both neurogenesis and neural differentiation. Both mechanisms are key in brain development, explaining characteristic cognitive deficiencies of Cockayne syndrome - such as stunted development of the nervous system - that otherwise do not seem related to symptoms like photosensitivity and hearing loss.

== Cockayne syndrome ==
In humans, Cockayne syndrome (CS) is a rare autosomal recessive leukodystrophy (associated with the degradation of white matter). CS arises from germ line mutations in either of two genes, CSA(ERCC8) or CSB(ERCC6). About two thirds of CS patients have a mutation in the CSB(ERCC6) gene. Mutations in ERCC6 that lead to CS deal with both the size of the protein as well as the specific amino acid residues utilized in biosynthesis. Patients exhibiting type II CS often have shortened and/or misfolded CSB that disrupt gene expression and transcription. The characteristic biological effect of malfunctioning ERCC6 is nerve cell death, resulting in premature aging and growth defects.

The extent to which malfunctioning CSB hinders oxidative repair heavily influences patients' neurological functioning. The two subforms of the disorder (the latter of which corresponds to ERCC6 defects) - CS-A and CS-B - both cause problems in the oxidative repair, though CS-B patients more often exhibit nerve system problems stemming from damage to this pathway. Most type II CS patients exhibit photosensitivity as per the heavily oxidative properties of UV light.

While two copies of mutated ERCC6 result in CS, possession of a single copy of mutated ERCC6 gene is associated with similar but milder defects as CS, including retinal dystrophy, cardiac arrhythmias, and immunodeficiency. Individuals who are heterozygote carriers are therefore at increased risk of similar pleiotropic disorders as homozygote carriers afflicted with CS.

== DNA repair ==
CSB and CSA proteins are considered to function in transcription coupled nucleotide excision repair (TC-NER). CSB and CSA deficient cells are unable to preferentially repair UV-induced cyclobutane pyrimidine dimers in actively transcribed genes, consistent with a failed TC-NER response. CSB also accumulates at sites of DNA double-strand breaks in a transcription dependent manner and influences double-strand break repair. CSB protein facilitates homologous recombinational repair of double-strand breaks and represses non-homologous end joining.

In a damaged cell, the CSB protein localizes to sites of DNA damage. CSB recruitment to damaged sites is influenced by the type of DNA damage and is, most rapid and robust as follows: interstrand crosslinks > double-strand breaks > monoadducts > oxidative damages. The CSB protein interacts with SNM1A(DCLRE1A) protein, a 5’- 3’ exonuclease, to promote the removal of DNA interstrand crosslinks.

== Implications in cancer ==
Single-nucleotide polymorphisms in the ERCC6 gene have been correlated with significantly increased risk of certain forms of cancer. A specific mutation at the 1097 position (M1097V) as well as polymorphisms at amino acid residue 1413 have been associated with heightened risk of bladder cancer for experimental subjects in Taiwan; moreover, M1097V has been argued to play a key role in pathogenesis. Rs1917799 polymorphism has been associated with increased risk of gastric cancer for Chinese experimental subjects, and mutations at codon 399 have been correlated to the onset of oral cancers among Taiwanese patients. Another study found a diverse set of mutations in the ERCC6 gene among Chinese lung cancer patients versus the general population (in terms of statistical significance), but failed to identify specific polymorphisms correlated with the patients' illness.

Faulty DNA repair is implicated causally in tumor development due to malfunctioning proteins' inability to correct genes responsible for apoptosis and cell growth. Yet, the vast majority of studies regarding the effects of ERCC6 knockout or mutations on cancer are based upon statistical correlations of available patient data as opposed to mechanistic analysis of in vivo cancer onset. Hence, confounding based on protein-protein, protein-substrate, and/or substrate-substrate interactions disallows conclusions positing mutations in ERCC6 cause cancer on an individual basis.
