= Uracil glycol =

Names
- IUPAC name 5,6-Dihydroxydihydro-2,4(1H,3H)-pyrimidinedione
- Other names 5,6-Dihydroxy-5,6-dihydrouracil

Identifiers
CAS Number	20433-38-9
3D model (JSmol)	Interactive image
ChemSpider	10816050
PubChem CID	22062653
CompTox Dashboard (EPA)	DTXSID601336141
- InChI: InChI=1S/C4H6N2O4/c7-1-2(8)5-4(10)6-3(1)9/h1-2,7-8H,(H2,5,6,9,10) Key: NHOKUDODDWSIAJ-UHFFFAOYSA-N
- SMILES: C1(C(NC(=O)NC1=O)O)O

Properties
Chemical formula	C_{4}H_{6}N_{2}O_{4}
Molar mass	146.102 g·mol^{−1}
- Except where otherwise noted, data are given for materials in their standard state (at 25 °C [77 °F], 100 kPa). Infobox references

Uracil glycol is a major oxidation product of cytosine in DNA. It can be readily bypassed by E. coli DNA polymerase I (unlike thymine glycol) and be a potent premutagenic lesion. Its name indicates its major structural nature: a glycol derivative of uracil, as the apparent 1,2-dihydroxylation of its alkene region.
