= NEIL1 =

Protein-coding gene in humans

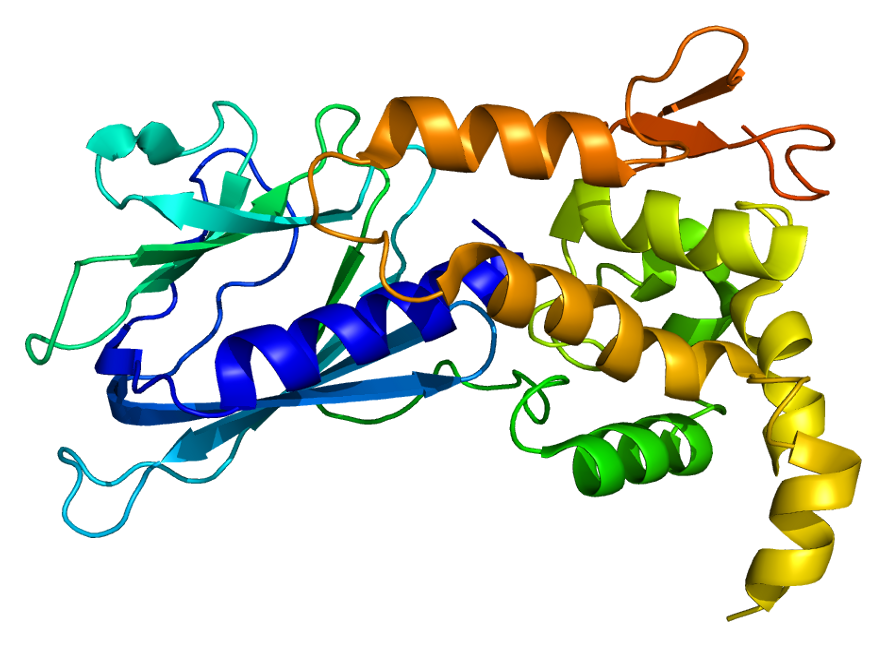

Identifiers
- Aliases: NEIL1, FPG1, NEI1, hFPG1, nei like DNA glycosylase 1
- External IDs: OMIM: 608844; MGI: 1920024; GeneCards: NEIL1
Available structures
PDB	Ortholog search: PDBe RCSB
PDB	List of PDB id codes 1TDH, 4NRV, 5ITY, 5ITQ, 5ITU, 5ITX, 5ITR, 5ITT
Enzyme activity
EC #	BRENDA	ExPASy	KEGG	MetaCyc
4.2.99.18	↗	↗	↗	↗

Gene location (Human)
Chr.	Chromosome 15 (human)
Band	15q24.2	Start	75,346,955 bp
Band	15q24.2	End	75,357,115 bp

Gene location (Mouse)
Chr.	Chromosome 9 (mouse)
Band	9|9 B	Start	57,050,084 bp
Band	9|9 B	End	57,055,589 bp
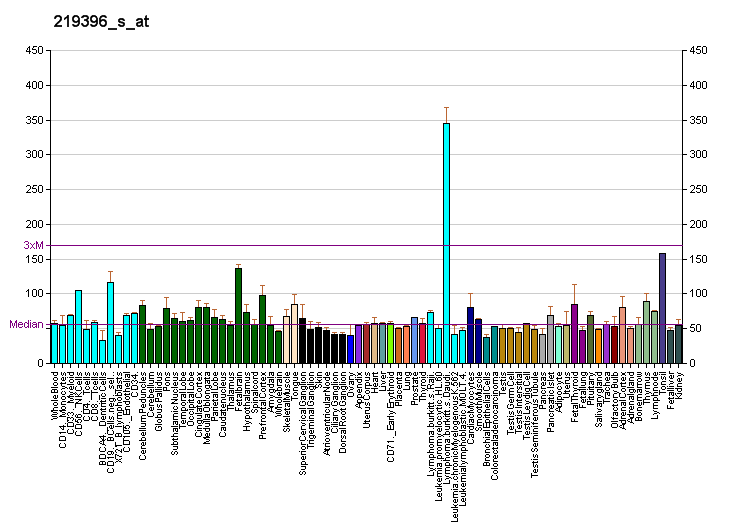
RNA expression pattern
Bgee	Human / Mouse (ortholog); Top expressed in: right uterine tube; right hemisphere of cerebellum; right adrenal cortex; right frontal lobe; minor salivary glands; left adrenal cortex; canal of the cervix; right lobe of liver; right lobe of thyroid gland; anterior pituitary / Top expressed in: mesenteric lymph nodes; thymus; submandibular gland; otolith organ; utricle; brown adipose tissue; hand; right kidney; proximal tubule; muscle of thigh; More reference expression data
BioGPS	More reference expression data
Gene ontology
Molecular function	DNA binding; zinc ion binding; hydrolase activity, hydrolyzing N-glycosyl compounds; hydrolase activity, acting on glycosyl bonds; damaged DNA binding; protein C-terminus binding; catalytic activity; lyase activity; nucleic acid binding; hydrolase activity; DNA N-glycosylase activity; DNA-(apurinic or apyrimidinic site) endonuclease activity; class I DNA-(apurinic or apyrimidinic site) endonuclease activity
Cellular component	cytoplasm; chromosome; microtubule organizing center; cytoskeleton; nucleus; nucleoplasm
Biological process	nucleotide-excision repair; response to oxidative stress; cellular response to DNA damage stimulus; depyrimidination; negative regulation of nuclease activity; metabolism; DNA repair; base-excision repair
Sources:Amigo / QuickGO
Orthologs
Databases	NCBI: entry; OMA: entry
Species	Human	Mouse
Entrez	79661	72774
Ensembl	ENSG00000140398	ENSMUSG00000032298
UniProt	Q96FI4	Q8K4Q6
RefSeq (mRNA)	NM_001256552; NM_024608; NM_001352519; NM_001352520	NM_028347; NM_001357409
RefSeq (protein)	NP_001243481; NP_078884; NP_001339448; NP_001339449	NP_082623; NP_001344338
Location (UCSC)	Chr 15: 75.35 – 75.36 Mb	Chr 9: 57.05 – 57.06 Mb
PubMed search
- Wikidata
View/Edit Human	View/Edit Mouse

Endonuclease VIII-like 1 is an enzyme that in humans is encoded by the NEIL1 gene.

NEIL1 belongs to a class of DNA glycosylases homologous to the bacterial Fpg/Nei family. These glycosylases initiate the first step in base excision repair by cleaving bases damaged by reactive oxygen species (ROS) and introducing a DNA strand break via the associated lyase reaction.

== Targets ==
NEIL1 recognizes (targets) and removes certain ROS-damaged bases and then incises the abasic site via β,δ elimination, leaving 3′ and 5′ phosphate ends. NEIL1 recognizes oxidized pyrimidines, formamidopyrimidines, thymine residues oxidized at the methyl group, and both stereoisomers of thymine glycol. The best substrates for human NEIL1 appear to be the hydantoin lesions, guanidinohydantoin, and spiroiminodihydantoin that are further oxidation products of 8-oxoG. NEIL1 is also capable of removing lesions from single-stranded DNA as well as from bubble and forked DNA structures. Because the expression of NEIL1 is cell-cycle dependent, and because it acts on forked DNA structures and interacts with PCNA and FEN-1, it has been proposed that NEIL1 functions in replication associated DNA repair.

== Deficiency in cancer ==
NEIL1 is one of the DNA repair genes most frequently hypermethylated in head and neck squamous cell carcinoma (HNSCC). When 160 human DNA repair genes were evaluated for aberrant methylation in HNSCC tumors, 62% of tumors were hypermethylated in the NEIL1 promoter region, causing NEIL1 messenger RNA and NEIL1 protein to be repressed. When 8 DNA repair genes were evaluated in non-small cell lung cancer (NSCLC) tumors, 42% were hypermethylated in the NEIL1 promoter region. This was the most frequent DNA repair deficiency found among the 8 DNA repair genes tested. NEIL1 was also one of six DNA repair genes found to be hypermethylated in their promoter regions in colorectal cancer.

While other DNA repair genes, such as MGMT and MLH1, are often evaluated for epigenetic repression in many types of cancer, epigenetic deficiency of NEIL1 is usually not evaluated, but might be of importance in such cancers as well.

DNA damage appears to be the primary underlying cause of cancer. If DNA repair is deficient, DNA damage tends to accumulate. Such excess DNA damage may increase mutational errors during DNA replication due to error-prone translesion synthesis. Excess DNA damage may also increase epigenetic alterations due to errors during DNA repair. Such mutations and epigenetic alterations may give rise to cancer (see malignant neoplasms).

In colon cancer, germ line mutations in DNA repair genes cause only 2–5% of cases. However, methylation of the promoter region of DNA repair genes (including NEIL1), are frequently associated with colon cancers and may be an important causal factor for these cancers.

In ovarian cancer, NEIL1 expression is frequently downregulated, particularly in cancer stem cell populations. This reduction contributes to enhanced chemoresistance and tumor progression by allowing DNA damage tolerance. Emerging evidence suggests that restoring NEIL1 activity may sensitize ovarian cancer cells to DNA-damaging therapies.

== Memory retention ==
NEIL1 promotes short-term spatial memory retention. Mice lacking NEIL1 have impaired memory retention in a water maze test.

== Stroke prevention ==
NEIL1 also protects against ischemic stroke-induced brain dysfunction and death in mice. NEIL1 deficiency causes brain damage and a functionally defective outcome in a mouse model of stroke.

== See also ==
- NEIL2
- NEIL3
- NTHL1
- OGG1
