= UV-sensitive syndrome =

- Other names: UVSS
- This condition is inherited in an autosomal recessive manner.
- Specialty: Dermatology

UV-sensitive syndrome is a cutaneous condition inherited in an autosomal recessive fashion, characterized by photosensitivity and solar lentigines. Recent research identified that mutations of the KIAA1530 (UVSSA) gene as cause for the development of UV-sensitive syndrome. Furthermore, this protein was identified as a new player in the Transcription-coupled repair (TC-NER).

== See also ==
- Solar urticaria
- List of cutaneous conditions
- Cockayne syndrome
- Xeroderma pigmentosum
- Nucleotide excision repair
