= Cockayne syndrome =

- Other names: Neill-Dingwall syndrome
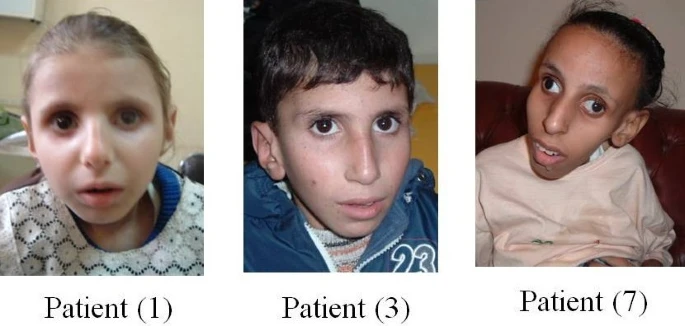
- A photo showing 3 children who have Cockayne syndrome
- Specialty: Medical genetics, neurology, dermatology

Cockayne syndrome (CS), also called Neill-Dingwall syndrome, is a rare and fatal autosomal recessive neurodegenerative disorder characterized by growth failure, impaired development of the nervous system, abnormal sensitivity to sunlight (photosensitivity), eye disorders and premature aging. Failure to thrive and neurological disorders are criteria for diagnosis, while photosensitivity, hearing loss, eye abnormalities, and cavities are other very common features. Problems with any or all of the internal organs are possible. It is associated with a group of disorders called leukodystrophies, which are conditions characterized by degradation of neurological white matter. There are two primary types of Cockayne syndrome: Cockayne syndrome type A (CSA), arising from mutations in the ERCC8 gene, and Cockayne syndrome type B (CSB), resulting from mutations in the ERCC6 gene.

The underlying disorder is a defect in a DNA repair mechanism. Unlike other defects of DNA repair, patients with CS are not predisposed to cancer or infection. Cockayne syndrome is a rare but destructive disease usually resulting in death within the first or second decade of life. The mutation of specific genes in Cockayne syndrome is known, but the widespread effects and its relationship with DNA repair is yet to be well understood.

It is named after English physician Edward Alfred Cockayne (1880–1956) who first described it in 1936 and re-described in 1946. Neill-Dingwall syndrome was named after Mary M. Dingwall and Catherine A. Neill. These two scientists described the case of two brothers with Cockayne syndrome and asserted it was the same disease described by Cockayne. In their article, the two contributed to the signs of the disease through their discovery of calcifications in the brain. They also compared Cockayne syndrome to what is now known as Hutchinson–Gilford progeria syndrome (HGPS), then called progeria, due to the accelerated aging that characterizes both disorders.

== Types ==
- CS Type I, the "classic" form, is characterized by normal fetal growth with the onset of abnormalities in the first two years of life. Vision and hearing gradually decline. The central and peripheral nervous systems progressively degenerate until death in the first or second decade of life as a result of serious neurological degradation. Cortical atrophy is less severe in CS Type I.
- CS Type II is present from birth (congenital) and is much more severe than CS Type 1. It involves very little neurological development after birth. Death usually occurs by age seven. This specific type has also been designated as cerebro-oculo-facio-skeletal (COFS) syndrome or Pena-Shokeir syndrome Type II. COFS syndrome is named so due to the effects it has on the brain, eyes, face, and skeletal system, as the disease frequently causes brain atrophy, cataracts, loss of fat in the face, and osteoporosis. COFS syndrome can be further subdivided into several conditions (COFS types 1, 2, 3 (associated with xeroderma pigmentosum) and 4). Typically patients with this early-onset form of the disorder show more severe brain damage, including reduced myelination of white matter, and more widespread calcifications, including in the cortex and basal ganglia.
- CS Type III, characterized by late-onset, is typically milder than Types I and II. Often patients with Type III will live into adulthood.
- Xeroderma pigmentosum-Cockayne syndrome (XP-CS) occurs when an individual also has xeroderma pigmentosum, another DNA repair disease. Some symptoms of each disease are expressed. For instance, freckling and pigment abnormalities characteristic of XP are present. The neurological disorder, spasticity, and underdevelopment of sexual organs characteristic of CS are seen. However, hypomyelination and the facial features of typical CS patients are not present.

== Causes ==
If hyperoxia or excess oxygen occurs in the body, the cellular metabolism produces several highly reactive forms of oxygen called free radicals. This can cause oxidative damage to cellular components including the DNA. In normal cells, the body repairs the damaged sections. In the case of Cockayne syndrome, due to subtle defects in transcription, children's genetic machinery for synthesizing proteins needed by the body does not operate at normal capacity. Over time this results in developmental failure and death.

Every minute, the body pumps 10 to 20 liters of oxygen through the blood, carrying it to billions of cells in the body. In its normal molecular form, oxygen is harmless. However, cellular metabolism involving oxygen can generate several highly reactive free radicals. These free radicals can cause oxidative damage to cellular components including the DNA. In an average human cell, several thousand lesions occur in the DNA every day. Many of these lesions result from oxidative damage. Each lesion—a damaged section of DNA—must be snipped out and the DNA repaired to preserve its normal function. Unrepaired DNA can lose its ability to code for proteins.

Mutations also can result. These mutations can activate oncogenes or silence tumor suppressor genes. According to research, oxidative damage to active genes is not preferentially repaired, and in the most severe cases, the repair is slowed throughout the whole genome. The resulting accumulation of oxidative damage could impair the normal functions of the DNA and may even result in triggering a program of cell death (apoptosis). The children with this disease do not repair the active genes where oxidative damage occurs. Normally, oxidative damage repair is faster in the active genes (which make up less than five percent of the genome) than in inactive regions of the DNA. The resulting accumulation of oxidative damage could impair the normal functions of the DNA and may even result in triggering a program of cell death (apoptosis).

== Genetics ==
Cockayne syndrome has an autosomal recessive pattern of inheritance.

Cockayne syndrome is classified genetically as follows:

Type	OMIM	Gene
A	216400	ERCC8 (also called CSA)
B	133540	ERCC6 (also called CSB)
C	216411	none known

- Mutations in the ERCC8 (also known as CSA) gene or the ERCC6 (also known as CSB) gene are the cause of Cockayne syndrome type A and type B. Mutations in the ERCC6 gene mutation makes up ~70% of cases. The proteins made by these genes are involved in repairing damaged DNA via the transcription-coupled repair mechanism, particularly the DNA in active genes. DNA damage is caused by ultraviolet rays from sunlight, radiation, or free radicals in the body. A normal cell can repair DNA damage before it accumulates. If either the ERCC6 or the ERCC8 gene is altered (as in Cockayne Syndrome), DNA damage encountered during transcription isn't repaired, causing RNA polymerase to stall at that location, interfering with gene expression. As the unrepaired DNA damage accumulates, progressively more active gene expression is impeded, leading to malfunctioning cells or cell death, which likely contributes to the signs of Cockayne Syndrome such as premature aging and neuronal hypomyelination.

== Mechanism ==
In contrast to cells with normal repair capability, CSA and CSB deficient cells are unable to preferentially repair cyclobutane pyrimidine dimers induced by the action of ultraviolet (UV) light on the template strand of actively transcribed genes. This deficiency reflects the loss of ability to perform the DNA repair process known as transcription coupled nucleotide excision repair (TC-NER).

Within the damaged cell, the CSA protein normally localizes to sites of DNA damage, particularly inter-strand cross-links, double-strand breaks and some monoadducts. CSB protein is also normally recruited to DNA damaged sites, and its recruitment is most rapid and robust as follows: interstrand crosslinks > double-strand breaks > monoadducts > oxidative damage. CSB protein forms a complex with another DNA repair protein, SNM1A (DCLRE1A), a 5' – 3' exonuclease, that localizes to inter-strand cross-links in a transcription dependent manner. The accumulation of CSB protein at sites of DNA double-strand breaks occurs in a transcription dependent manner and facilitates homologous recombinational repair of the breaks. During the G0/G1 phase of the cell cycle, DNA damage can trigger a CSB-dependent recombinational repair process that uses an RNA (rather than DNA) template.

The premature aging features of CS are likely due, at least in part, to the deficiencies in DNA repair (see DNA damage theory of aging).

== Diagnosis ==
People with this syndrome have smaller than normal head sizes (microcephaly), are of short stature (dwarfism), their eyes appear sunken, and they have an "aged" look. They often have long limbs with joint contractures (inability to relax the muscle at a joint), a hunched back (kyphosis), and they may be very thin (cachetic), due to a loss of subcutaneous fat. Their small chin, large ears, and pointy, thin nose often give an aged appearance. The skin of those with Cockayne syndrome is also frequently affected: hyperpigmentation, varicose or spider veins (telangiectasia), and serious sensitivity to sunlight are common, even in individuals without XP-CS. Often patients with Cockayne Syndrome will severely burn or blister with very little heat exposure. The eyes of patients can be affected in various ways and eye abnormalities are common in CS. Cataracts and cloudiness of the cornea (corneal opacity) are common. The loss of and damage to the nerves of the optic nerve, causing optic atrophy, can occur. Nystagmus, or involuntary eye movement, and pupils that fail to dilate demonstrate a loss of control of voluntary and involuntary muscle movement. A salt and pepper retinal pigmentation is also a typical sign. Diagnosis is determined by a specific test for DNA repair, which measures the recovery of RNA after exposure to UV radiation. Despite being associated with genes involved in nucleotide excision repair (NER), unlike xeroderma pigmentosum, CS is not associated with an increased risk of cancer.

=== Laboratory studies ===
In Cockayne syndrome patients, UV-irradiated cells show decreased DNA and RNA synthesis. Laboratory studies are mainly useful to eliminate other disorders. For example, skeletal radiography, endocrinologic tests, and chromosomal breakage studies can help in excluding disorders included in the differential diagnosis.

=== Imaging studies ===
Brain CT scanning in Cockayne syndrome patients may reveal calcifications and cortical atrophy.

=== Other tests ===
Prenatal evaluation is possible. Amniotic fluid cell culturing is used to demonstrate that fetal cells are deficient in RNA synthesis after UV irradiation.

=== Neurology ===
Imaging studies reveal a widespread absence of the myelin sheaths of the neurons in the white matter of the brain and general atrophy of the cortex. Calcifications have also been found in the putamen, an area of the forebrain that regulates movements and aids in some forms of learning, along with the cortex. Additionally, atrophy of the central area of the cerebellum found in patients with Cockayne syndrome could also result in the lack of muscle control, particularly involuntary, and poor posture typically seen.

== Treatment ==
There is no cure for this syndrome, although patients can be symptomatically treated. Treatment usually involves physical therapy and minor surgeries to the affected organs, such as cataract removal. Also wearing high-factor sunscreen and protective clothing is recommended because Cockayne Syndrome patients are very sensitive to UV radiation. Optimal nutrition can also help. Genetic counseling for the parents is recommended, as the disorder has a 25% chance of being passed to any future children, and prenatal testing is also a possibility. Another important aspect is the prevention of recurrence of CS in other siblings. Identification of gene defects involved makes it possible to offer genetic counseling and antenatal diagnostic testing to the parents who already have one affected child.

Currently, there are two ongoing projects focused on the development of gene therapy for Cockayne syndrome. The first project, led by the Viljem Julijan Association for Children with Rare Diseases, aims to develop gene therapy specifically for Cockayne syndrome type B. The second project, led by the Riaan Research Initiative, is dedicated to the development of gene therapy for Cockayne syndrome type A.

== Prognosis ==
The prognosis for those with Cockayne syndrome is poor, as death typically occurs by the age of 12. The prognosis for Cockayne syndrome varies by disease type. There are three types of Cockayne syndrome according to the severity and onset of the symptoms. However, the differences between the types are not always clear-cut, and some researchers believe the signs and symptoms reflect a spectrum instead of distinct types: Cockayne syndrome Type A (CSA) is marked by normal development until a child is 1 or 2 years old, at which point growth slows and developmental delays are noticed. Symptoms are not apparent until they are 1 year. Life expectancy for type A is approximately 10 to 20 years. These symptoms are seen in CS type 1 children. Cockayne syndrome type B (CSB), also known as "cerebro-oculo-facio-skeletal (COFS) syndrome" (or "Pena-Shokeir syndrome type B"), is the most severe subtype. Symptoms are present at birth and normal brain development stops after birth. The average lifespan for children with type B is up to 7 years of age. These symptoms are seen in CS type 2 children. Cockayne syndrome type C (CSC) appears later in childhood with milder symptoms than the other types and a slower progression of the disorder. People with this type of Cockayne syndrome live into adulthood, with an average lifespan of 40 to 50 years. These symptoms are seen in CS type 3.

== Epidemiology ==
Cockayne syndrome is rare worldwide. No racial predilection is reported for Cockayne syndrome. No sexual predilection is described for Cockayne syndrome; the male-to-female ratio is equal. Cockayne syndrome I (CS-A) manifests in childhood. Cockayne syndrome II (CS-B) manifests at birth or in infancy, and it has a worse prognosis.

== Recent research ==
The recent research on Jan 2018 mentions different CS features that are seen globally with similarities and differences: CS has an incidence of 1 in 250,000 live births, and a prevalence of approximately 1 per 2.5 million, which is remarkably consistent across various regions globally:

Affected parts	Clinical features	pathology
Face	Wizened faceies. Sunken eyes, large ears, thin pointy nose. Small chin. Dental caries, enamel hypoplasia	
Skin, hair, nails	Photosensitivity. Wrinkled and aged appearing skin. Thin dry hair, prematurely gray hair. Poor venous access.	
Central nervous system	Microcephaly usually beginning at age 2. Mental retardation with low IQ. Delayed milestones.Tremors, ataxia, seizures, strokes, and subdural hemorrhages.	Demyelination – is patchy and segmental– "Metachromatic leukodystrophy". Both oligodendroglia and Schwann cells are affected. Affects cerebral white matter, corpus callosum, brainstem, spinal cord, and peripheral nerves. Neuronal loss at multiple sites, especially the cerebellum. Loss of anterior horn cells due to anterograde and/or retrograde degeneration. Calcification [55–95%] of the cerebral cortex (especially depths of sulci, basal ganglia, cerebellum, thalamus; also of the arteries, arterioles, and capillaries). Vascular changes - String vessels, especially in areas of Metachromatic leukodystrophy, calcification in leptomeningeal vessels, accelerated atherosclerosis and arteriolosclerosis. Gliosis is present. Astrocytes and microglia may show irregular cytoplasm, multiple nuclei. May be seen as a high-intensity white matter on FLAIR MRI sequences signals. No major brain malformations. Relative sparing of the cerebral cortex, slight thinning of cortical ribbon may be seen. Normal gyral pattern with widening of sulci. Lamination, neuronal size, and configuration of the neocortex are preserved. May show parietal occipital dominance. Severe cerebellar atrophy. Loss of Purkinje, granular neurons, and in some cases neurons in the dentate nucleus. Dendrites of Purkinje cells may be grossly deformed ("cactus flowers"), ferruginated dendrites. Dendrites have fewer higher order branches. Purkinje "axonal torpedoes" may be present. Ventricular enlargement, enlarged cisterna magna are seen. Amyloid plaques, neurofibrillary tangles, Hirano bodies not commonly seen, although ubiquitin reactivity of axons present
Hearing and vestibular systems	Sensorineural, high tone hearing loss [60–90%]. Mixed conductive and sensorineural hearing loss (44%) Most commonly bilateral, rarely unilateral	Loss of hair cells in the cochlea, particularly in the basal turn. Loss of neurons in spiral ganglion. Atrophy of auditory pathways. Scala communis, thickened stapes curare, widened prototympanum. Loss of hair cells in pars superior. Loss of neurons in vestibular ganglion. Collapse of the endolymphatic duct of pars inferior
Vision	Corneal opacification. Cataracts [36–86%]. Usually bilateral, most develop by 4 years of age. Pigmentary retinopathy ("salt and pepper")[43–89%]. Miotic pupils, Optic disk pallor, Enophthalmos, Narrow palpebral fissures.	Patchy loss of melanin pigment granules. Lipofuscin deposition, large pigment laden cells in a perivascular distribution. Retinal pigment epithelial atrophy and hyperplasia. Loss of cells in ganglion and outer nuclear cell layers. Both the outer and inner segments of photoreceptors are affected. Optic nerve atrophy, with partial demyelination, axonal loss, and gliosis
Musculoskeletal system	Cachectic dwarfism. Contractures. Kyphosis, scoliosis. Stooped posture. Muscle wasting.	Denervation myopathy, disuse atrophy
Cardiovascular system	Accelerated hypertension. Aortic root dilatation. Cardiomyopathy.	Increased intima medial thickening. Atherosclerosis, arteriosclerosis.
Gastrointestinal system	Severe reflux. Abnormal gastrointestinal motility. Many have percutaneous gastrostomy tubes. Hepatomegaly, splenomegaly, elevated liver enzymes. Altered metabolism of drugs	-
Renal system	Renal failure	Renal arteries show changes in advanced atherosclerosis and arteriolosclerosis. Unilateral or hypoplastic kidneys.
Reproductive system	-	-
Males	Micropenis, smaller testicular size	-
Females	Ovarian atrophy. A successful pregnancy has been reported.	-
Endocrine systems	Normal secondary sexual characteristics. Normal growth hormone, thyroid-stimulating hormone, calcium levels	Normal pituitary gland and thyroid gland
Eccrine systems	Decreased production of sweat, tears, saliva	-

== See also ==
- Accelerated aging disease
- Biogerontology
- Degenerative disease
- Genetic disorder
- CAMFAK syndrome — thought to be a form (or subset) of Cockayne syndrome
