= 8-Oxoguanine =

Names
- IUPAC name 2-Amino-7,9-dihydro-1H-purine-6,8-dione
- Other names 7,8-Dihydro-8-oxoguanine; 8-Oxo-7,8-dihydroguanine

Identifiers
| CAS Number | 5614-64-2 |
| 3D model (JSmol) | Interactive image |
| ChEBI | CHEBI:52617 |
| ChemSpider | 58661 |
| ECHA InfoCard | 100.024.578 |
| KEGG | C20155 |
| MeSH | 8-hydroxyguanine |
| PubChem CID | 135420630 |
| UNII | V5WDN6HY4L |
| CompTox Dashboard (EPA) | DTXSID10204673 |
- InChI: InChI=1S/C5H5N5O2/c6-4-8-2-1(3(11)10-4)7-5(12)9-2/h(H5,6,7,8,9,10,11,12) Key: CLGFIVUFZRGQRP-UHFFFAOYSA-N
- SMILES: C12=C(NC(=NC1=O)N)NC(=O)N2

Properties
| Chemical formula | C_{5}H_{5}N_{5}O_{2} |
| Molar mass | 167.128 g·mol^{−1} |
- Except where otherwise noted, data are given for materials in their standard state (at 25 °C [77 °F], 100 kPa). Infobox references

8-Oxoguanine (8-oxo-7,8-dihydroguanine, 8-hydroxyguanine, 8-oxo-Gua, or OH^{8}Gua) is one of the most common DNA lesions resulting from reactive oxygen species modifying guanine, and can result in a mismatched pairing with adenine resulting in G to T and C to A substitutions in the genome. In humans, it is primarily repaired by DNA glycosylase OGG1. It can be caused by ionizing radiation, in connection with oxidative metabolism.

8-oxoG (syn) in a Hoogsteen base pair with dA (anti)

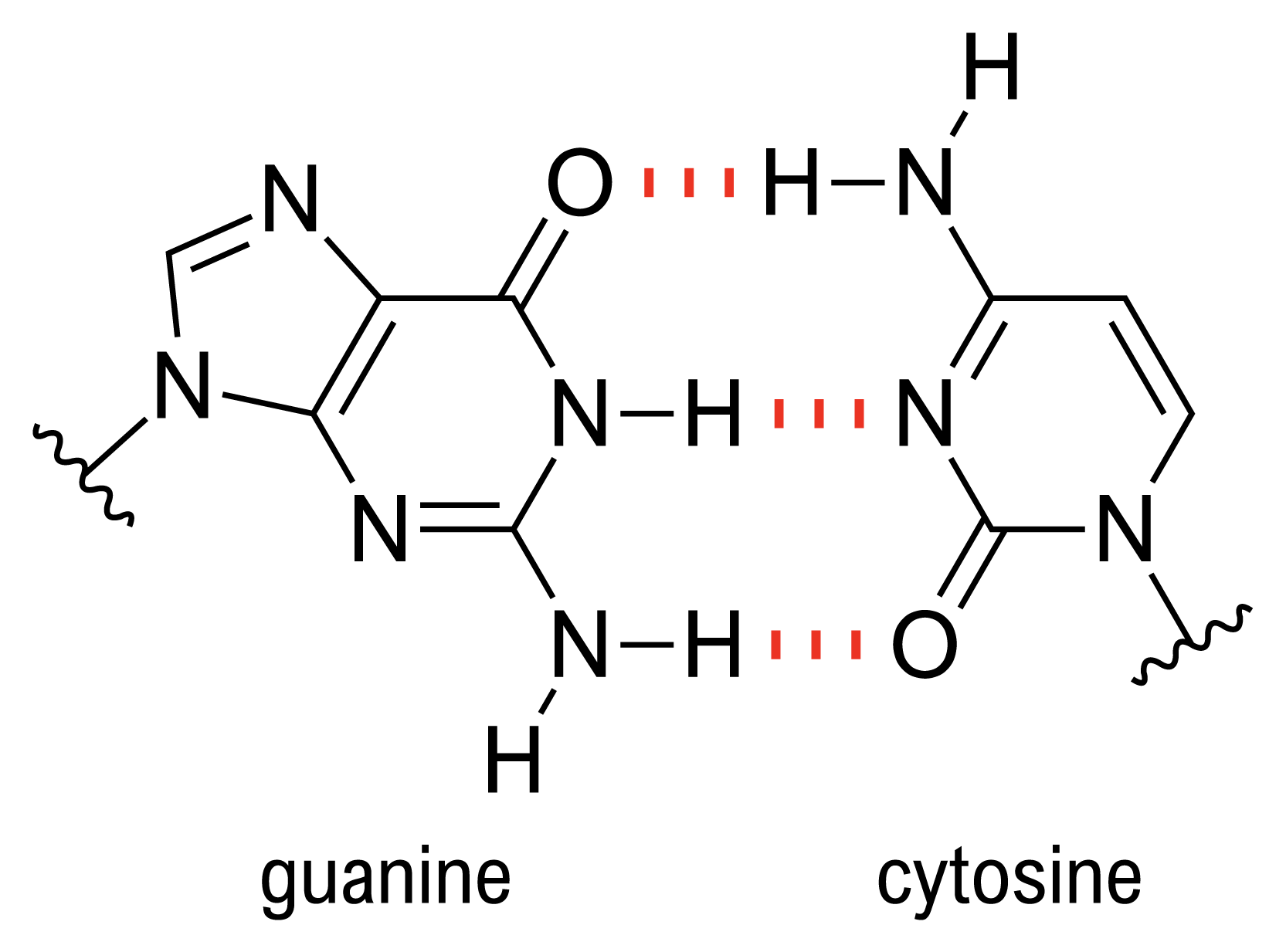
For comparison here is a standard (non-mutagenic) GC base pair with both bases in the anti configuration of the bond between base and sugar.

== In body fluids ==
Increased concentrations of 8-oxoguanine in body fluids have been found to be associated with increased risk of mutagenesis and carcinogenesis.

Care must be taken in the assay of 8-oxoguanine due to the ease with which it can be oxidised during extraction and the assay procedure.

== Cancer, aging, infertility ==
The role of the deoxyriboside form of 8-oxoguanine, 8-oxo-2'-deoxyguanosine (abbreviated 8-oxo-dG or 8-OHdG) in cancer and aging also applies to 8-oxoguanine. Oxoguanine glycosylase is employed in the removal of 8-oxoguanine from DNA by the process of base excision repair. As described in oxoguanine glycosylase, deficient expression of this enzyme causes 8-oxoguanine to accumulate in DNA. This accumulation may then lead upon replication of DNA to mutations including some that contribute to carcinogenesis. 8-oxoguanine is usually formed by the interaction of reactive oxygen species (ROS) with the guanine base in DNA under conditions of oxidative stress; as noted in the article about them, such species may have a role in aging and male infertility, and 8-oxoguanine can be used to measure such stress.
