= 5-Hydroxycytosine =

Names
- Preferred IUPAC name 4-Amino-5-hydroxypyrimidin-2(1H)-one
- Other names 4-Amino-5-hydroxypyrimidine-2-one

Identifiers
CAS Number	13484-95-2
3D model (JSmol)	Interactive image
ChemSpider	2283052
PubChem CID	3014752 tautomer
UNII	P72XNU89LE
CompTox Dashboard (EPA)	DTXSID00928775
- InChI: InChI=1S/C4H5N3O2/c5-3-2(8)1-6-4(9)7-3/h1,8H,(H3,5,6,7,9) COPY Key: NLLCDONDZDHLCI-UHFFFAOYSA-N
- SMILES: c1c(c([nH]c(=O)n1)N)O

Properties
Chemical formula	C_{4}H_{5}N_{3}O_{2}
Molar mass	127.103 g·mol^{−1}
- Except where otherwise noted, data are given for materials in their standard state (at 25 °C [77 °F], 100 kPa). Infobox references

5-Hydroxycytosine is an oxidized form of cytosine that is associated with an increased frequency of C to T transition mutations, with some C to G transversions. It does not distort the DNA molecule and is readily bypassed by replicative DNA polymerases.

It has been shown in vitro to miscode for adenine.

5-hydroxycytosine is imperative for parallel DNA triplex formation, explaining why parallel triplexes form only at pH 6 and below.
