= Oxoguanine glycosylase =

DNA glycosylase enzyme

OGG1
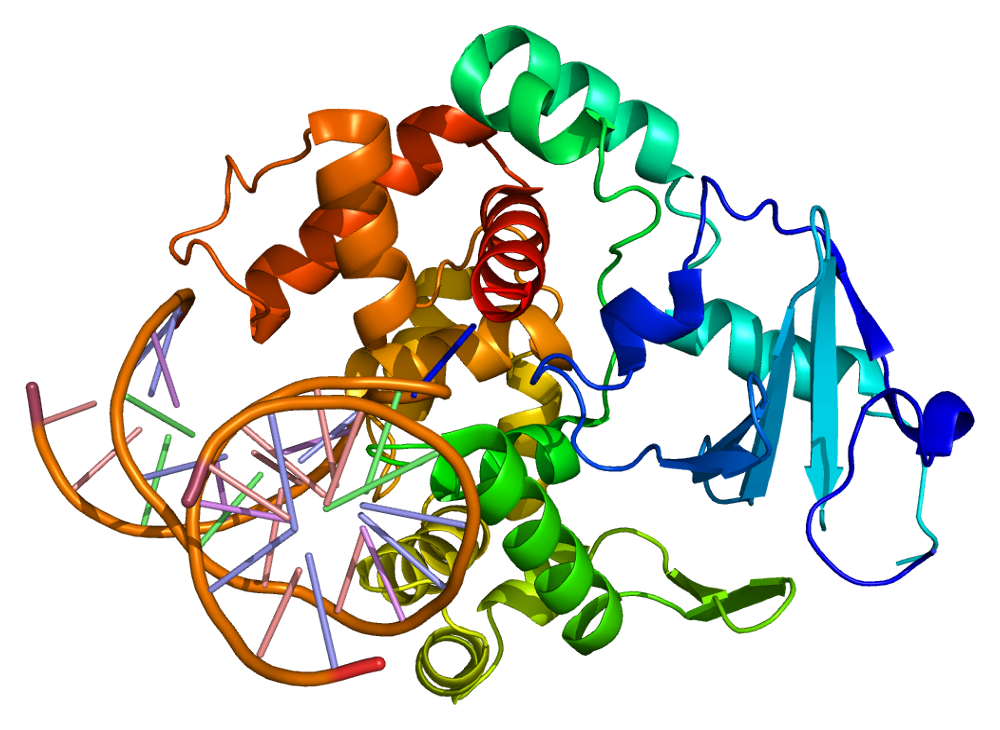

Identifiers
- Aliases: OGG1, HMMH, HMUTM, OGH1, 8-oxoguanine DNA glycosylase
- External IDs: OMIM: 601982; MGI: 1097693; GeneCards: OGG1
Available structures
| PDB | Ortholog search: PDBe RCSB |
| PDB | List of PDB id codes 1EBM, 1FN7, 1HU0, 1KO9, 1LWV, 1LWW, 1LWY, 1M3H, 1M3Q, 1N39, 1N3A, 1N3C, 1YQK, 1YQL, 1YQM, 1YQR, 2I5W, 2NOB, 2NOE, 2NOF, 2NOH, 2NOI, 2NOL, 2NOZ, 2XHI, 3IH7, 3KTU, 5AN4 |
Enzyme activity
| EC # | BRENDA | ExPASy | KEGG | MetaCyc |
|---|---|---|---|---|
| 4.2.99.18 | ↗ | ↗ | ↗ | ↗ |

Gene location (Human)
| Chr. | Chromosome 3 (human) |
| Band | 3p25.3 | Start | 9,749,944 bp |
| Band | 3p25.3 | End | 9,788,219 bp |

Gene location (Mouse)
| Chr. | Chromosome 6 (mouse) |
| Band | 6 E3|6 52.75 cM | Start | 113,303,933 bp |
| Band | 6 E3|6 52.75 cM | End | 113,312,029 bp |
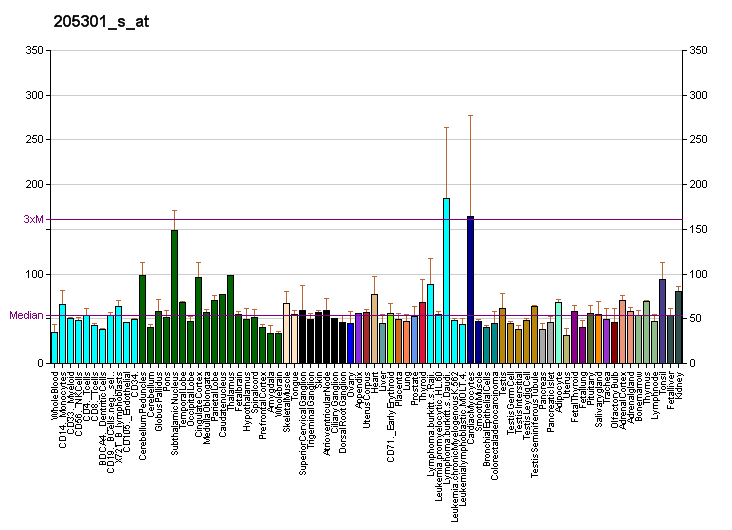

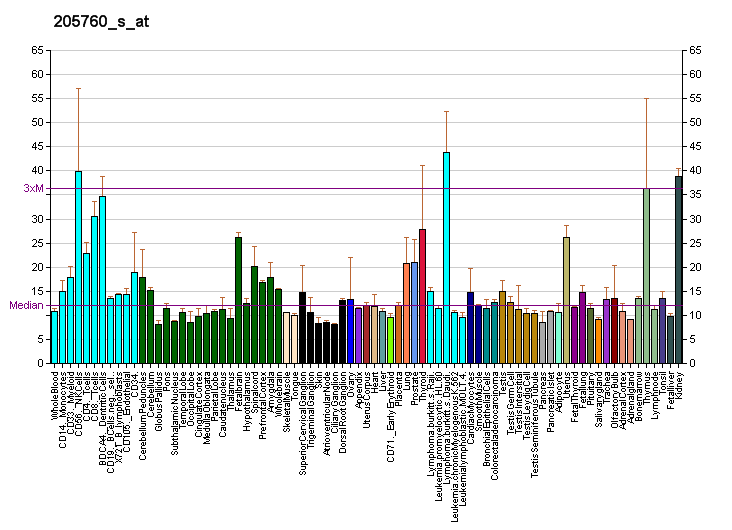
RNA expression pattern
| Bgee | Human / Mouse (ortholog); Top expressed in: ganglionic eminence; ventricular zone; oocyte; right ovary; left ovary; human kidney; body of uterus; granulocyte; parotid gland; left uterine tube / Top expressed in: spermatocyte; spermatid; granulocyte; yolk sac; zygote; tail of embryo; ventricular zone; blastocyst; seminiferous tubule; genital tubercle; More reference expression data |
| BioGPS | More reference expression data |
Gene ontology
| Molecular function | DNA binding; microtubule binding; hydrolase activity, acting on glycosyl bonds; oxidized purine DNA binding; catalytic activity; protein binding; oxidized purine nucleobase lesion DNA N-glycosylase activity; lyase activity; endonuclease activity; 8-oxo-7,8-dihydroguanine DNA N-glycosylase activity; hydrolase activity; damaged DNA binding; DNA N-glycosylase activity; class I DNA-(apurinic or apyrimidinic site) endonuclease activity |
| Cellular component | mitochondrion; nuclear matrix; nucleus; nuclear speck; nucleoplasm; protein-containing complex |
| Biological process | depurination; nucleotide-excision repair; response to estradiol; regulation of transcription, DNA-templated; response to light stimulus; ageing; negative regulation of apoptotic process; cellular response to cadmium ion; response to oxidative stress; depyrimidination; acute inflammatory response; response to radiation; response to folic acid; metabolism; response to ethanol; nucleotide-excision repair, DNA incision; negative regulation of double-strand break repair via single-strand annealing; base-excision repair; cellular response to DNA damage stimulus; DNA repair; base-excision repair, AP site formation; telomere maintenance via telomerase |
Sources:Amigo / QuickGO
Orthologs
| Databases | NCBI: entry; OMA: entry |
| Species | Human | Mouse |
| Entrez | 4968 | 18294 |
| Ensembl | ENSG00000114026 | ENSMUSG00000030271 |
| UniProt | O15527 | O08760 |
| RefSeq (mRNA) | NM_002542; NM_016819; NM_016820; NM_016821; NM_016826 NM_016827; NM_016828; NM_016829; NM_001354648; NM_001354649; NM_001354650; NM_001354651; NM_001354652 | NM_010957 |
| RefSeq (protein) | NP_002533; NP_058212; NP_058213; NP_058214; NP_058434 NP_058436; NP_058437; NP_058438; NP_001341577; NP_001341578; NP_001341579; NP_001341580; NP_001341581; NP_058436.1; NP_058434.1 | NP_035087 |
| Location (UCSC) | Chr 3: 9.75 – 9.79 Mb | Chr 6: 113.3 – 113.31 Mb |
| PubMed search |
- Wikidata
| View/Edit Human | View/Edit Mouse |

8-oxoguanine DNA glycosylase, N-terminal domain
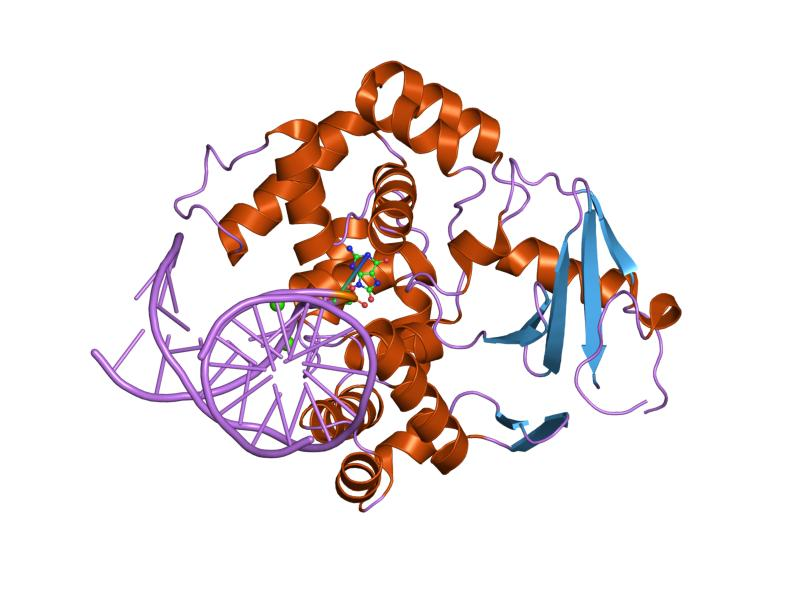
- structure of catalytically inactive q315a human 8-oxoguanine glycosylase complexed to 8-oxoguanine dna

Identifiers
- Symbol: OGG_N
- Pfam: PF07934
- Pfam clan: CL0407
- InterPro: IPR012904
- SCOP2: 1ebm / SCOPe / SUPFAM
Available protein structures:
- PDB: IPR012904 PF07934 (ECOD; PDBsum)
- AlphaFold: IPR012904; PF07934

8-Oxoguanine glycosylase, also known as OGG1, is a DNA glycosylase enzyme that, in humans, is encoded by the OGG1 gene. It is involved in base excision repair. It is found in bacterial, archaeal and eukaryotic species.

== Function ==
OGG1 is the primary enzyme responsible for the excision of 8-oxoguanine (8-oxoG), a mutagenic base byproduct that occurs as a result of exposure to reactive oxygen species (ROS). OGG1 is a bifunctional glycosylase, as it is able to both cleave the glycosidic bond of the mutagenic lesion and cause a strand break in the DNA backbone. Alternative splicing of the C-terminal region of this gene classifies splice variants into two major groups, type 1 and type 2, depending on the last exon of the sequence. Type 1 alternative splice variants end with exon 7 and type 2 end with exon 8. One set of spliced forms are designated 1a, 1b, 2a to 2e. All variants have the N-terminal region in common. Many alternative splice variants for this gene have been described, but the full-length nature for every variant has not been determined. In eukaryotes, the N-terminus of this gene contains a mitochondrial targeting signal, essential for mitochondrial localization. However, OGG1-1a also has a nuclear location signal at its C-terminal end that suppresses mitochondrial targeting and causes OGG1-1a to localize to the nucleus. The main form of OGG1 that localizes to the mitochondria is OGG1-2a. A conserved N-terminal domain contributes residues to the 8-oxoguanine binding pocket. This domain is organised into a single copy of a TBP-like fold.

Despite the presumed importance of this enzyme, mice lacking Ogg1 have been generated and found to have a normal lifespan, and Ogg1 knockout mice have a higher probability to develop cancer, whereas MTH1 gene disruption concomitantly suppresses lung cancer development in Ogg1-/- mice. Mice lacking Ogg1 have been shown to be prone to increased body weight and obesity, as well as high-fat-diet-induced insulin resistance. There is some controversy as to whether deletion of Ogg1 actually leads to increased 8-Oxo-2'-deoxyguanosine (8-oxo-dG) levels: high performance liquid chromatography with electrochemical detection (HPLC-ECD) assay suggests the deletion can lead to an up to 6 fold higher level of 8-oxo-dG in nuclear DNA and a 20-fold higher level in mitochondrial DNA, whereas DNA-fapy glycosylase assay indicates no change in 8-oxo-dG levels.

Increased oxidant stress temporarily inactivates OGG1, which recruits transcription factors such as NFkB and thereby activates expression of inflammatory genes.

== OGG1 deficiency and increased 8-oxo-dG in mice ==
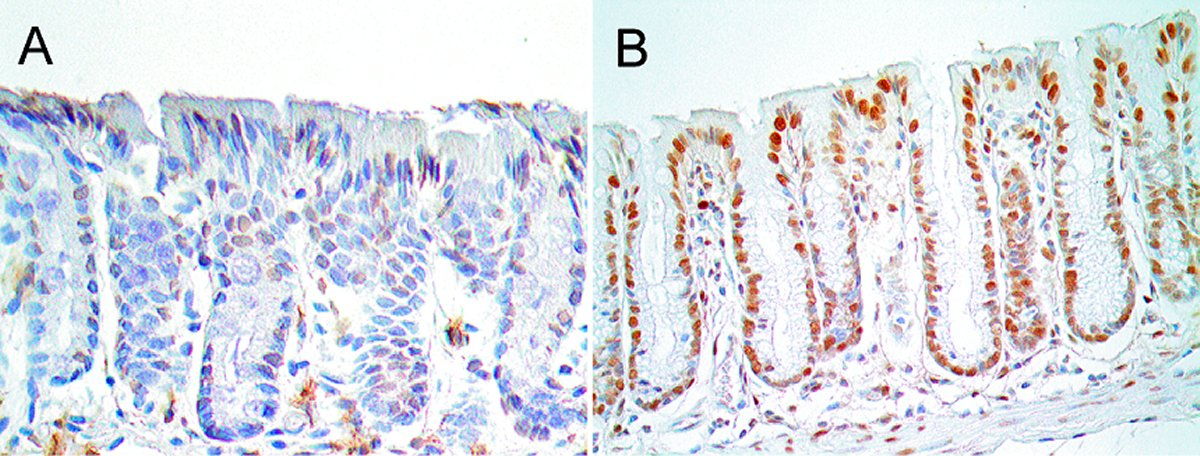
Colonic epithelium from a mouse not undergoing colonic tumorigenesis (A), and a mouse that is undergoing colonic tumorigenesis (B). Cell nuclei are stained dark blue with hematoxylin (for nucleic acid) and immunostained brown for 8-oxo-dG. The level of 8-oxo-dG was graded in the nuclei of colonic crypt cells on a scale of 0-4. Mice not undergoing tumorigenesis had crypt 8-oxo-dG at levels 0 to 2 (panel A shows level 1) while mice progressing to colonic tumors had 8-oxo-dG in colonic crypts at levels 3 to 4 (panel B shows level 4) Tumorigenesis was induced by adding deoxycholate to the mouse diet to give a level of deoxycholate in the mouse colon similar to the level in the colon of humans on a high fat diet. The images were made from original photomicrographs.

Mice without a functional OGG1 gene have about a 5-fold increased level of 8-oxo-dG in their livers compared to mice with wild-type OGG1. Mice defective in OGG1 also have an increased risk for cancer. Kunisada et al. irradiated mice without a functional OGG1 gene (OGG1 knock-out mice) and wild-type mice three times a week for 40 weeks with UVB light at a relatively low dose (not enough to cause skin redness). Both types of mice had high levels of 8-oxo-dG in their epidermal cells three hours after irradiation. After 24 hours, over half of the initial amount of 8-oxo-dG was absent from the epidermal cells of the wild-type mice, but 8-oxo-dG remained elevated in the epidermal cells of the OGG1 knock-out mice. The irradiated OGG1 knock-out mice went on to develop more than twice the incidence of skin tumors compared to irradiated wild-type mice, and the rate of malignancy within the tumors was higher in the OGG1 knock-out mice (73%) than in the wild-type mice (50%).

As reviewed by Valavanidis et al., increased levels of 8-oxo-dG in a tissue can serve as a biomarker of oxidative stress. They also noted that increased levels of 8-oxo-dG are frequently found during carcinogenesis.

In the figure showing examples of mouse colonic epithelium, the colonic epithelium from a mouse on a normal diet was found to have a low level of 8-oxo-dG in its colonic crypts (panel A). However, a mouse likely undergoing colonic tumorigenesis (due to deoxycholate added to its diet) was found to have a high level of 8-oxo-dG in its colonic epithelium (panel B). Deoxycholate increases intracellular production of reactive oxygen resulting in increased oxidative stress, and this can lead to tumorigenesis and carcinogenesis.

== Epigenetic control ==
In a breast cancer study, the methylation level of the OGG1 promoter was found to be negatively correlated with expression level of OGG1 messenger RNA. This means that hypermethylation was associated with low expression of OGG1 and hypomethylation was correlated with over-expression of OGG1. Thus, OGG1 expression is under epigenetic control. Breast cancers with methylation levels of the OGG1 promoter that were more than two standard deviations either above or below the normal were each associated with reduced patient survival.

== In cancers ==
OGG1 is the primary enzyme responsible for the excision of 8-oxo-dG. Even when OGG1 expression is normal, the presence of 8-oxo-dG is mutagenic, since OGG1 is not 100% effective. Yasui et al. examined the fate of 8-oxo-dG when this oxidized derivative of deoxyguanosine was inserted into a specific gene in 800 cells in culture. After replication of the cells, 8-oxo-dG was restored to G in 86% of the clones, probably reflecting accurate OGG1 base excision repair or translesion synthesis without mutation. G:C to T:A transversions occurred in 5.9% of the clones, single base deletions in 2.1% and G:C to C:G transversions in 1.2%. Together, these mutations were the most common, totalling 9.2% of the 14% of mutations generated at the site of the 8-oxo-dG insertion. Among the other mutations in the 800 clones analyzed, there were also 3 larger deletions, of sizes 6, 33 and 135 base pairs. Thus 8-oxo-dG can directly cause mutations, some of which may contribute to carcinogenesis.

If OGG1 expression is reduced in cells, increased mutagenesis, and therefore increased carcinogenesis, would be expected. The table below lists some cancers associated with reduced expression of OGG1.

Table 1. OGG1 expression in sporadic cancers
| Cancer | Expression | Form of OGG1 | 8-oxo-dG | Evaluation method | Ref. |
| Head and neck cancer | Under-expression | OGG1-2a | - | messenger RNA | |
| Adenocarcinoma of gastric cardia | Under-expression | cytoplasmic | increased | immunohistochemistry | |
| Astrocytoma | Under-expression | total cell OGG1 | - | messenger RNA | |
| Esophageal cancer | 48% Under-expression | nuclear | increased | immunohistochemistry | |
| - | 40% Under-expression | cytoplasm | increased | immunohistochemistry | |

== OGG1 or OGG activity in blood, and cancer ==
OGG1 methylation levels in blood cells were measured in a prospective study of 582 US military veterans, median age 72, and followed for 13 years. High OGG1 methylation at a particular promoter region was associated with increased risk for any cancer, and in particular for risk of prostate cancer.

Enzymatic activity excising 8-oxoguanine from DNA (OGG activity) was reduced in peripheral blood mononuclear cells (PBMCs), and in paired lung tissue, from patients with non–small cell lung cancer. OGG activity was also reduced in PBMCs of patients with head and neck squamous cell carcinoma (HNSCC).

An important effect on cancer is expected to derive from the drastic enhancement of gene expression for certain immunity genes, which OGG1 regulates.

== Interactions ==
Oxoguanine glycosylase has been shown to interact with XRCC1 and PKC alpha.

== Pathology ==
- OGG1 may be associated with cancer risk in BRCA1 and BRCA2 mutation carriers.

== As a treatment target ==
Several small molecule inhibitors of OGG1 have been reported as starting points for treatments against cancer and inflammatory diseases.

== See also ==
- MUTYH
- NTHL1
- NEIL1
