= Hereditary cancer syndrome =

Inherited genetic condition that predisposes a person to cancer

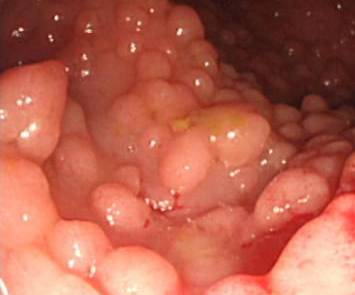
Familial adenomatous polyposis is a cancer syndrome in which there are hundreds to thousands of benign adenomas in the colon.

A hereditary cancer syndrome (familial/family cancer syndrome, inherited cancer syndrome, cancer predisposition syndrome, cancer syndrome) is a genetic disorder in which inherited genetic mutations in one or more genes predispose the affected individuals to the development of cancer and may also cause early onset of these cancers. Hereditary cancer syndromes often show not only a high lifetime risk of developing cancer, but also the development of multiple independent primary tumors.

Many of these syndromes are caused by mutations in tumor suppressor genes, genes that are involved in protecting the cell from turning cancerous. Other genes that may be affected are DNA repair genes, oncogenes and genes involved in the production of blood vessels (angiogenesis). Common examples of inherited cancer syndromes are hereditary breast-ovarian cancer syndrome and hereditary non-polyposis colon cancer (Lynch syndrome).

== Background ==
Hereditary cancer syndromes underlie 5 to 10% of all cancers and there are over 50 identifiable hereditary forms of cancer. Scientific understanding of cancer susceptibility syndromes is actively expanding: additional syndromes are being found, the underlying biology is becoming clearer, and genetic testing is improving detection, treatment, and prevention of cancer syndromes. Given the prevalence of breast and colon cancer, the most widely recognized syndromes include hereditary breast-ovarian cancer syndrome and hereditary non-polyposis colon cancer (Lynch syndrome).

Some rare cancers are strongly associated with hereditary cancer predisposition syndromes. Genetic testing should be considered with adrenocortical carcinoma; carcinoid tumors; diffuse gastric cancer; fallopian tube/primary peritoneal cancer; leiomyosarcoma; medullary thyroid cancer; paraganglioma/pheochromocytoma; renal cell carcinoma of chromophobe, hybrid oncocytic, or oncocytoma histology; sebaceous carcinoma; and sex cord tumors with annular tubules. Primary care physicians can identify people who are at risk of a hereditary cancer syndrome.

== Genetics of cancer ==
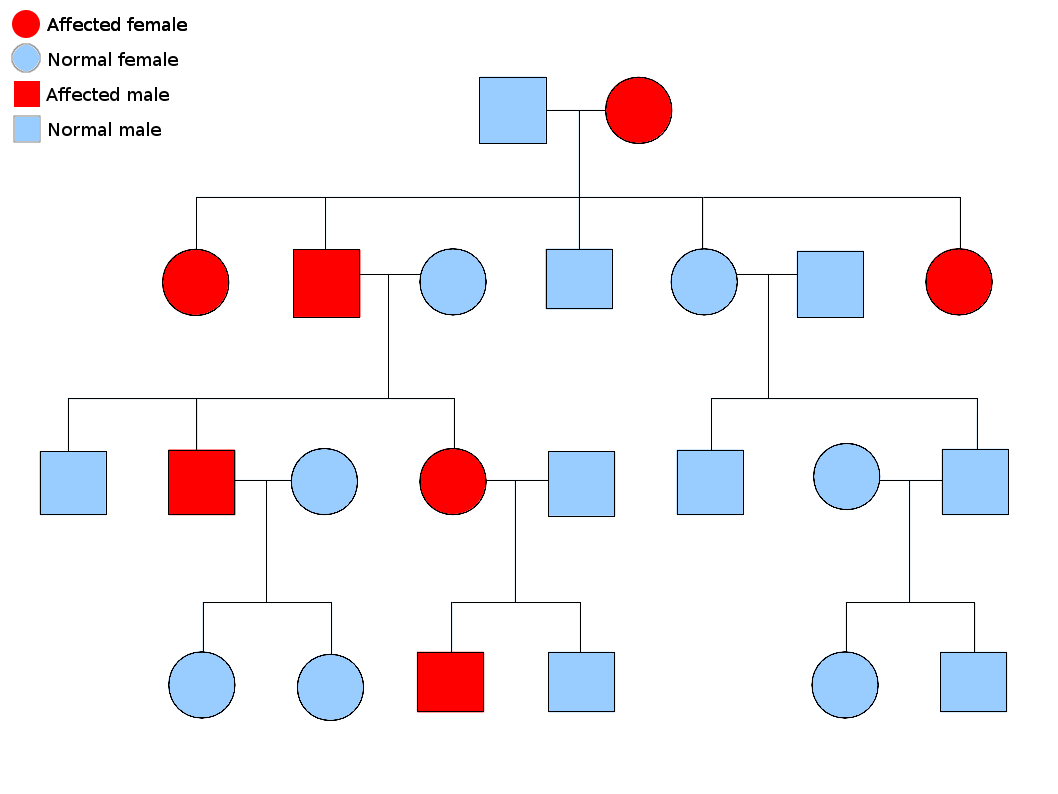
Example pedigree chart of autosomal dominant inheritance. Many cancer syndromes are inherited in this manner.

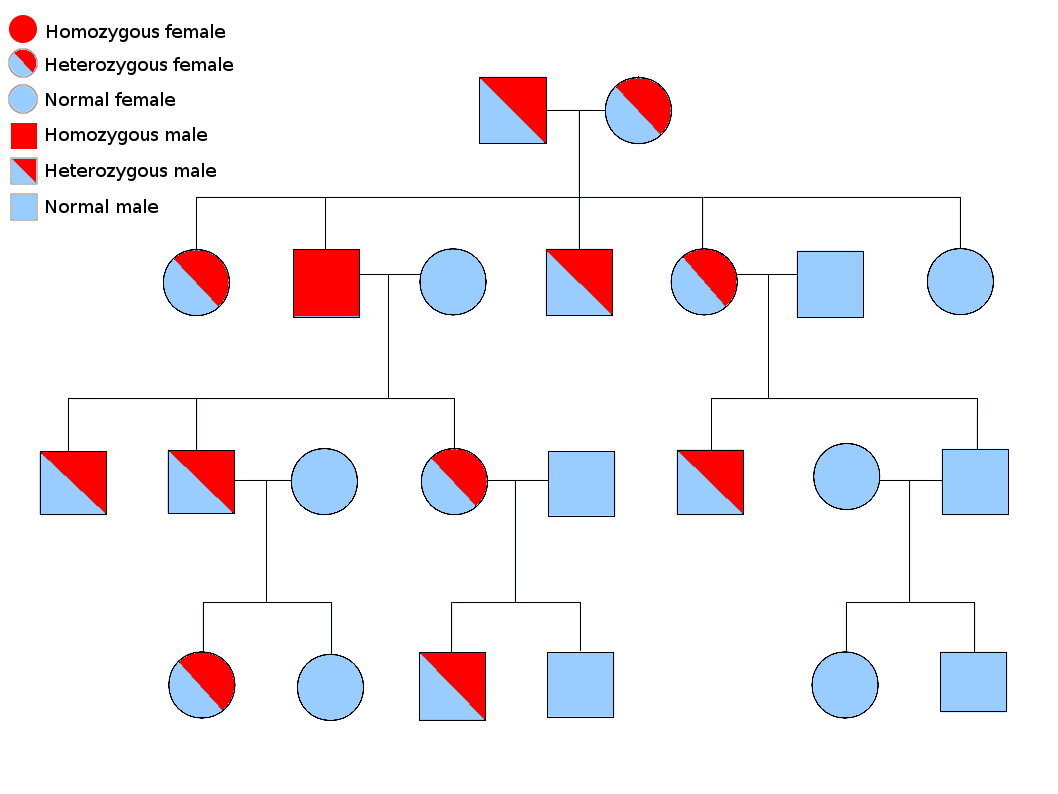
Less commonly, cancer syndromes are inherited in an autosomal recessive manner. In this example pedigree chart the only person that will have an increased risk of cancer is the homozygous recessive male in the second generation; although there are many carriers of the gene.

Two copies of every gene are present in all cells of the body and each one is called an allele. Most cancer syndromes are transmitted in a mendelian autosomal dominant manner. In these cases, only one faulty allele has to be present for an individual to have a predisposition to cancer. Individuals with one normal allele and one faulty allele are known as heterozygous. A heterozygous individual and a person with two normal alleles (homozygous) will have a 50% chance of producing an affected child. The mutation in the inherited gene is known as a germline mutation and a further mutation in the normal allele results in the development of cancer. This is known as Knudson's two-hit hypothesis, where the first hit of the gene is the inherited mutation and the second hit occurs later in life. As only one allele needs to be mutated (as compared to both in so-called "sporadic cancers"), the individual has a higher chance of developing the cancer than the general population.

Less often, syndromes may be transmitted as an autosomal recessive trait. Both alleles of a gene must be mutated in autosomal recessive disorders for an individual to have a predisposition to cancer. A person with two recessive alleles is known as homozygous recessive. Both parents must have at least one faulty allele in order for a child to be homozygous recessive. If both parents have one mutant allele and one normal allele (heterozygous) then they have a 25% chance of producing a homozygous recessive child (has predisposition), 50% chance of producing a heterozygous child (carrier of the faulty gene) and 25% chance of produced a child with two normal alleles.

Examples of autosomal dominant cancer syndromes are autoimmune lymphoproliferative syndrome (Canale-Smith syndrome), Beckwith–Wiedemann syndrome (although 85% of cases are sporadic), Birt–Hogg–Dubé syndrome, Carney syndrome, familial chordoma, Cowden syndrome, dysplastic nevus syndrome with familial melanoma, familial adenomatous polyposis, hereditary breast–ovarian cancer syndrome, hereditary diffuse gastric cancer (HDGC), Hereditary nonpolyposis colorectal cancer (Lynch syndrome), Howel–Evans syndrome of esophageal cancer with tylosis, juvenile polyposis syndrome, Li–Fraumeni syndrome, multiple endocrine neoplasia type 1/2, multiple osteochondromatosis, neurofibromatosis type 1/2, nevoid basal-cell carcinoma syndrome (Gorlin syndrome), Peutz–Jeghers syndrome, familial prostate cancer, hereditary leiomyomatosis renal cell cancer (LRCC), hereditary papillary renal cell cancer, hereditary paraganglioma-pheochromocytoma syndrome, retinoblastoma, tuberous sclerosis, von Hippel–Lindau disease and Wilm's tumor.

Examples of autosomal recessive cancer syndromes are ataxia–telangiectasia, Bloom syndrome, Fanconi anemia, MUTYH-associated polyposis, Rothmund–Thomson syndrome, Werner syndrome and Xeroderma pigmentosum.

== Examples ==
Although cancer syndromes exhibit an increased risk of cancer, the risk varies. For some of these diseases, cancer is not their primary feature.

=== Fanconi anemia ===
Fanconi anemia is a disorder with a wide clinical spectrum, including: early onset and increased risk of cancer; bone marrow failure; and congenital abnormalities. The most prominent manifestations of this disorder are those related to hematopoeisis (production of blood by the bone marrow); these include aplastic anemia, myelodysplastic syndrome and acute myeloid leukemia. Hepatic tumors and squamous cell carcinomas of the esophagus, oropharynx and uvula are solid tumors commonly linked to FA. Congenital abnormalities include: skeletal anomalies (especially those affecting the hands), cafe au lait spots and hypopigmentation. To date, the genes known to cause FA are: FANCA, FANCB, FANCC, FANCD2, FANCE, FANCF, FANCG, FANCI, FANCJ, FANCL, FANCM, FANCN, FANCO, FANCP and BRCA2 (previously known as FANCD1). Inheritance of this syndrome is primarily autosomal recessive, but FANCB can be inherited from the maternal or paternal x-chromosome (x-linked recessive inheritance). The FA pathway is involved in DNA repair when the two strands of DNA are incorrectly joined (interstrand crosslinks). Many pathways are coordinated by the FA pathway for this including nucleotide excision repair, translesion synthesis and homologous recombination.

=== Familial adenomatous polyposis ===
Familial adenomatous polyposis (FAP) is an autosomal dominant syndrome that greatly increases the risk of colorectal cancer. Around 1 in 8000 people will have this disease and it has approximately 100% penetrance. An individual with this disease will have hundreds to thousands of benign adenomas throughout their colon, which will in most cases progress to cancer. Other tumors increased in frequency include; osteomas, adrenal adenomas and carcinomas, thyroid tumors and desmoid tumors. The cause of this disorder is a mutated APC gene, which is involved in β-catenin regulation. Faulty APC causes β-catenin to accumulate in cells and activate transcription factors involved in cell proliferation, migration, differentiation and apoptosis (programmed cell death).

=== Hereditary breast and ovarian cancer ===
Hereditary breast-ovarian cancer syndrome is an autosomal dominant genetic disorder caused by genetic mutations of the BRCA1 and BRCA2 genes. In women this disorder primarily increases the risk of breast and ovarian cancer, but also increases the risk of fallopian tube carcinoma and papillary serous carcinoma of the peritoneum. In men the risk of prostate cancer is increased. Other cancers that are inconsistently linked to this syndrome are pancreatic cancer, male breast cancer, colorectal cancer and cancers of the uterus and cervix. Genetic mutations account for approximately 7% and 14% of breast and ovarian cancer, respectively, and BRCA1 and BRCA2 account for 80% of these cases. BRCA1 and BRCA2 are both tumor suppressor genes implicated in maintaining and repairing DNA, which in turn leads to genome instability. Mutations in these genes allow further damage to DNA, which can lead to cancer.

=== Hereditary non-polyposis colon cancer ===
Hereditary non-polyposis colon cancer, also known as Lynch syndrome, is an autosomal dominant cancer syndrome that increases the risk of colorectal cancer. It is caused by genetic mutations in DNA mismatch repair (MMR) genes, notably MLH1, MSH2, MSH6 and PMS2. In addition to colorectal cancer many other cancers are increased in frequency. These include; endometrial cancer, stomach cancer, ovarian cancer, cancers of the small bowel and pancreatic cancer. Hereditary non-polyposis colon cancer is also associated with an early onset of colorectal cancer. MMR genes are involved in repairing DNA when the bases on each strand of DNA do not match. Defective MMR genes allow continuous insertion and deletion mutations in regions of DNA known as microsatellites. These short repetitive sequences of DNA become unstable, leading to a state of microsatellite instability (MSI). Mutated microsatellites are often found in genes involved in tumor initiation and progression, and MSI can enhance the survival of cells, leading to cancer.

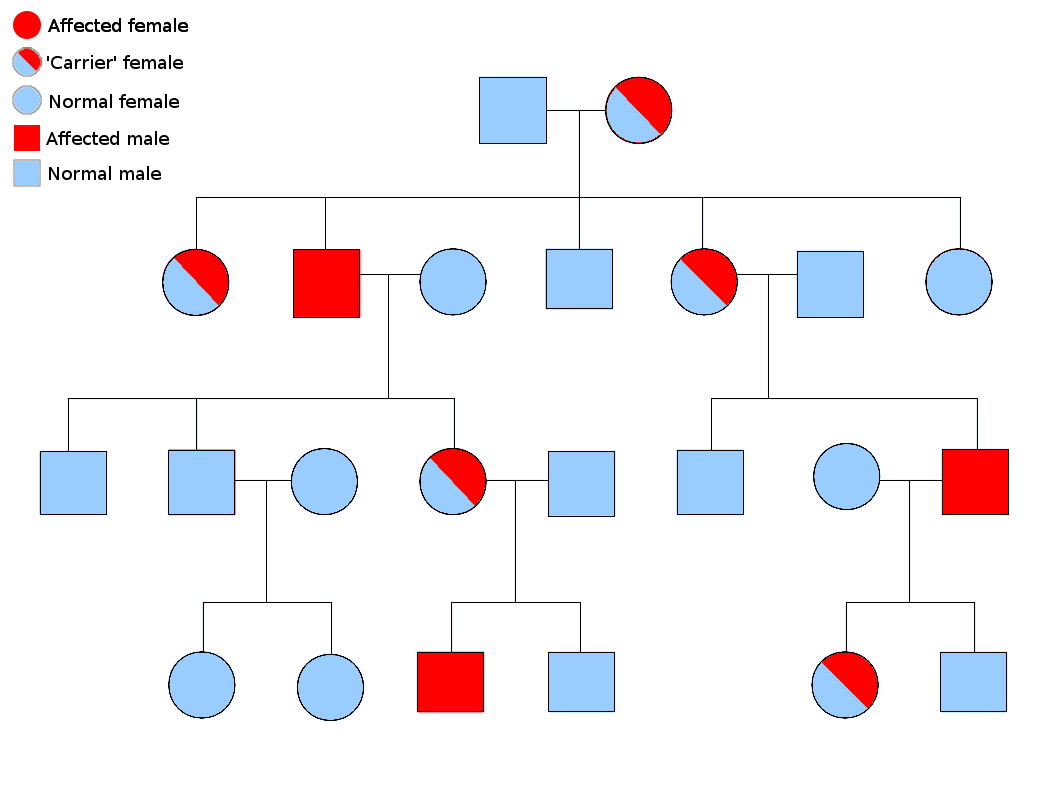
Although the majority of Fanconi anemia cases are inherited in an autosomal recessive manner, those caused by FANCB are inherited through x-linked recessive inheritance. This example pedigree chart shows how inheritance of X-linked Fanconi anemia might occur through several generations.

=== Hereditary paraganglioma-pheochromocytoma syndrome ===
Most cases of familial paraganglioma are caused by mutations in the succinate dehydrogenase (succinate:ubiquinone oxidoreductase) subunit genes (SDHD, SDHAF2, SDHC, SDHB).

PGL-1 is associated with SDHD mutation, and most PGL-1 individuals with paraganglioma have affected fathers rather than affected mothers. PGL1 and PGL2 are autosomal dominant with imprinting. PGL-4 is associated with SDHB mutation and is associated with a higher risk of pheochromocytoma, as well as renal cell cancer and non-medullary thyroid cancer.

=== Li-Fraumeni syndrome ===
Li-Fraumeni syndrome is an autosomal dominant syndrome primarily caused by mutations in the TP53 gene, which greatly increases the risk of many cancers and is also highly associated with early onset of these cancers. Cancers linked to this disorder include; soft tissue sarcomas (often found in childhood), osteosarcoma, breast cancer, brain cancer, leukaemia and adrenocortical carcinoma. Individuals with Li-Fraumeni syndrome often have multiple independent primary cancers. The reason for the large clinical spectrum of this disorder may be due to other gene mutations that modify the disease. The protein produced by the TP53 gene, p53, is involved in cell cycle arrest, DNA repair and apoptosis. Defective p53 may not be able to properly perform these processes, which may be the reason for tumor formation. Because only 60-80% of individuals with the disorder have detectable mutations in TP53, other mutations in the p53 pathway may be involved in Li-Fraumeni syndrome. Individuals with LFS need lifelong intensive screening for early cancer detection. See Li-Fraumeni Syndrome for more information.

=== MUTYH-associated polyposis ===
MUTYH-associated polyposis shares most of its clinical features with FAP; the difference is that it is an autosomal recessive disorder caused by mutations in the MUTYH DNA repair gene. Tumors with increased risk in this disorder are colorectal cancer, gastric adenomas and duodenal adenomas.

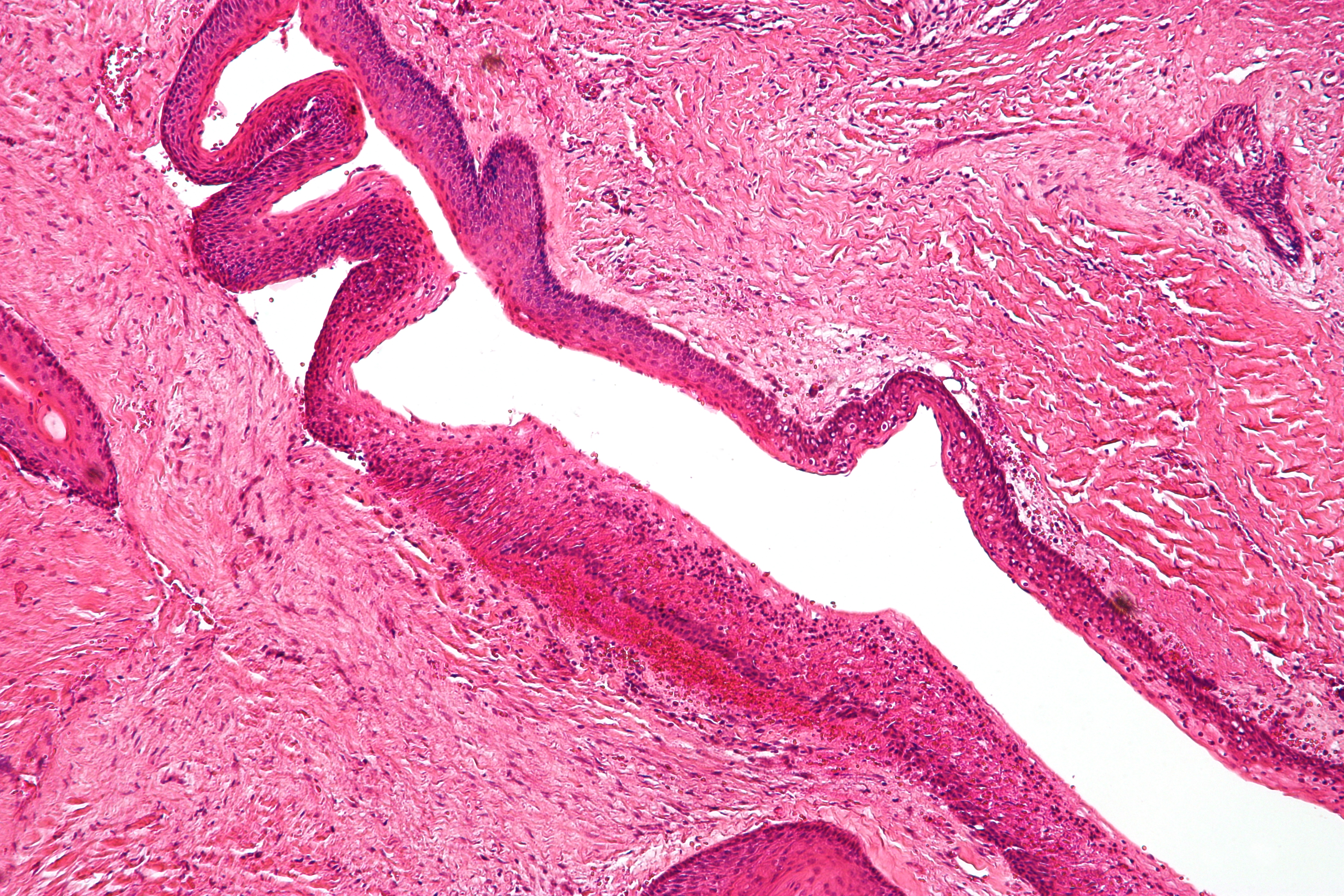
Micrograph showing keratocystic odontogenic tumour, a common finding in nevoid basal cell carcinoma syndrome. H&E stain.

=== Nevoid basal cell carcinoma syndrome ===
Nevoid basal cell carcinoma syndrome, also known as Gorlin syndrome, is an autosomal dominant cancer syndrome in which the risk of basal cell carcinoma is very high. The disease is characterized by basal cell nevi, jaw keratocysts and skeletal abnormalities. Estimates of nevoid basal cell carcinoma syndrome prevalence varies, but is approximately 1 in 60000. The presence of basal cell carcinoma is much higher in white than black individuals; 80% and 38%, respectively. Odontogenic keratocysts are found in approximately 75% of individuals with the disease and often occur early in life. The most common skeletal abnormalities occur in the head and face, but other areas are often affected such as the rib cage. The causative genetic mutation of this disease occurs in the PTCH gene, and the product of PTCH is a tumor suppressor involved in cell signaling. Although the exact role of this protein in nevoid basal cell carcinoma syndrome is not known, it is involved in the hedgehog signaling pathway, known to control cell growth and development.

=== Von Hippel–Lindau disease ===
Von Hippel–Lindau disease is a rare, autosomal dominant genetic condition that predisposes individuals to benign and malignant tumors. The most common tumors in Von Hippel–Lindau disease are central nervous system and retinal hemangioblastomas, clear cell renal carcinomas, pheochromocytomas, pancreatic neuroendocrine tumours, pancreatic cysts, endolymphatic sac tumors and epididymal papillary cystadenomas. Von Hippel–Lindau disease results from a mutation in the von Hippel–Lindau tumor suppressor gene on chromosome 3p25.3.

=== Xeroderma pigmentosum ===
Xeroderma pigmentosum is an autosomal recessive disorder characterized by sensitivity to ultra-violet (UV) light, massively increased risk of sunburn and increased risk of skin cancers. The risk of skin cancer is more than 10000 times that of normal individuals and includes many types of skin cancer, including melanoma and non-melanoma skin cancers. Also, sun exposed areas of the tongue, lips and eyes have an increased risk of becoming cancerous. Xeroderma pigmentosum may be associated with other internal cancers and benign tumors. In addition to cancer, some genetic mutations that cause xeroderma pigmentosum are associated with neurodegeneration. Xeroderma pigmentosum may be caused by genetic mutations in 8 genes, which produce the following enzymes: XPA, XPB, XPC, XPD, XPE, XPF, XPG and Pol η. XPA-XPF are nucleotide excision repair enzymes that repair UV light-damaged DNA and faulty proteins will allow the buildup of mutations caused by UV light. Pol η is a polymerase, which is an enzyme involved in DNA replication. There are many polymerases, but pol η is the enzyme that replicates UV light-damaged DNA. Mutations in this gene will produce a faulty pol η enzyme that cannot replicate DNA with UV light damage. Individuals with mutations of this gene have a subset of XP; XP-variant disease.

== DNA repair defects and increased cancer risk ==
Many cancer syndromes are due to an inherited impairment in DNA repair capability. When an inherited mutation is present in a DNA repair gene, the repair gene will either not be expressed or expressed in an altered form. Then the repair function will likely be deficient, and, as a consequence, DNA damages will tend to accumulate. Such DNA damages can cause errors during DNA synthesis leading to mutations, some of which may give rise to cancer. Germ-line DNA repair mutations that increase the risk of cancer are listed in the Table.

Inherited DNA repair gene mutations that increase cancer risk
DNA repair gene	Protein	Repair pathways affected*	Cancers with increased risk
ataxia telangiectasia mutated	ATM	Different mutations in ATM reduce HRR, SSA or NHEJ	leukemia, lymphoma, breast
Bloom syndrome	BLM (helicase)	HRR	leukemia, lymphoma, colon, breast, skin, lung, auditory canal, tongue, esophagus, stomach, tonsil, larynx, uterus
breast cancer 1 & 2	BRCA1 BRCA2	HRR of double strand breaks and daughter strand gaps	breast, ovarian
Fanconi anemia genes FANCA,B,C,D1,D2,E,F,G,I,J,L,M,N,O,P	FANCA etc.	HRR and TLS	leukemia, liver tumors, solid tumors many areas
Hereditary nonpolyposis colorectal cancer genes MSH2 MSH6 MLH1 PMS2	MSH2 MSH6 MLH1 PMS2	MMR	colorectal, endometrial, ovariain, gastrointestinal tract (stomach and small intestine, pancreas, biliary tract), urinary tract, brain (glioblastomas), and skin (keratoacanthomas and sebaceous adenomas)
Li-Fraumeni syndrome gene TP53	P53	Direct role in HRR, BER, NER and acts in DNA damage response for those pathways and for NHEJ and MMR	sarcomas, breast cancers, brain tumors, and adrenocortical carcinomas
MRE11A	MRE11	HRR and NHEJ	breast
MUTYH	MUTYH glycosylase	BER of A paired with 8-oxo-dG	colorectal, duodenal, ovarian, bladder and skin cancers
Nijmegen breakage syndrome	NBS (NBN)	NHEJ	lymphoid cancers
NTHL1	NTHL1	BER for Tg, FapyG, 5-hC, 5-hU in dsDNA	Colon cancer, endometrial cancer, duodenal cancer, basal-cell carcinoma
RECQL4	RECQ4	Helicase likely active in HRR	basal cell carcinoma, squamous cell carcinoma, intraepidermal carcinoma
Werner syndrome gene WRN	Werner syndrome ATP-dependent helicase	HRR, NHEJ, long patch BER	soft tissue sarcoma, colorectal, skin, thyroid, pancreas
Xeroderma pigmentosum genes XPA, XPB, XPD, XPF, XPG	XPA XPB XPD XPF XPG	Transcription coupled NER repairs the transcribed strands of transcriptionally active genes	skin cancer (melanoma and non-melanoma)
Xeroderma pigmentosum genes XPC, XPE (DDB2)	XPC, XPE	Global genomic NER, repairs damage in both transcribed and untranscribed DNA	skin cancer (melanoma and non-melanoma)
XPV (also called polymerase H)	DNA polymerase eta (Pol η)	Translesion synthesis (TLS)	skin cancers (basal cell, squamous cell, melanoma)

- The acronyms for DNA repair pathways are HRR homologous recombinational repair, SSA sub-pathway of HRR, NHEJ non-homologous end joining, BER base excision repair, TLS translesion synthesis, NER nucleotide excision repair, MMR mismatch repair.

== Genetic screening ==
Genetic testing can be used to identify mutated genes or chromosomes that are passed through generations. People who test positive for having a genetic mutation are not necessarily condemned to develop the cancer linked with the mutation, however they possess an increased risk of developing cancer in comparison to the general population. It is advised that people get a genetic test if their family medical history includes: Multiple family members with cancer, someone in their family that got cancer at a particularly young age or by being part of a certain ethnic group.

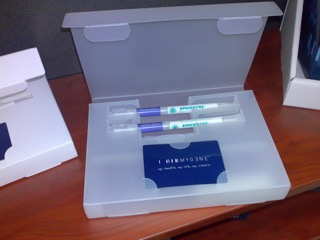
An example of a direct to consumer genetic testing kit. This kit comes from the company 'MyGene'.

The process of genetic screening is a simple, non-invasive procedure. However, before genes are tested for mutations the patient usually must go to a health care provider and go through a one-on-one consultation, where they discuss both the personal and family history of cancer. The medical professional can then assess the likelihood of the patient having the mutation and can guide them through the process that is genetic screening. It is important that this consultation takes place because it ensures that the person gives informed consent to engage in genetic testing, is aware and understands the steps, benefits and limitations of the procedure and is more knowledgeable of the consequences of hearing test results. The test can be done by using body fluids or cells of the patient, this includes; blood (which is the most common), saliva, amniotic fluid and even cells from the interior of the mouth gotten from a buccal swab. This material is then sent to a specialized genetics lab where technicians will examine it, the test results are sent back to the health provider who requested the analysis and results are discussed with the patient.

Direct to consumer testing can be obtained without a medical professional but is not recommended as the consumer loses the opportunity to discuss their decision with an educated professional. According to the National Library of Medicine in the U.S. genetic testing in America costs in the price range of $100-$2000 depending on the type and intricacy of test.

== Preventive actions ==
Genetic testing is important as if a test comes out positive they are more aware of their own personal health and the health of immediate family members. With the help and advice from a medical professional they can take steps to reduce their elevated risk of cancer development through:

- Regular exercise
- A healthy, balanced diet
- Maintaining a healthy weight
- Not smoking
- Staying safe under the sun's harmful rays

There are other forms of preventive actions, an example for Hereditary Breast and Ovarian Cancer would be to go through surgery: A hysterectomy is the removal of all or some of the uterus, whereas a mastectomy is removing a breast (double mastectomy meaning that both breasts are removed), this can often add years onto their life expectancy. Another preventive measure is regular cancer screening and check-ups. If a person has Lynch syndrome then they should have a regular colonoscopy to examine if there is any change in the cells lining the intestinal wall, regular check-ups are associated with an additional 7 years onto the life expectancy on average for a person with Lynch syndrome. This is because early detection means the correct preventive actions and surgery can be taken quicker. Regular breast screening is also recommended for women diagnosed with BRCA mutations, as well as that, recent studies show that men with increased risks of developing prostate cancer due to BRCA mutations can decrease their risk by taking aspirin. Aspirin is hugely beneficial in lowering cancer prevalence; however, it must be taken regularly over at least a five-year period to have any effect.

== Prevalence of genetic mutations in different ethnic groups ==
Often genetic mutations are more common in certain ethnic groups, this is because a race can track their ancestors back to one geographic location, the mutated genes are then passed from ancestors down through generations which is why some ethnicities are more susceptible to mutations, thus increasing their chances of developing cancer [61]. As mentioned above, this can be useful as it can help health professionals assess a patient's risk of having a mutation before they undergo testing. Werner syndrome has a prevalence of 1 in 200,000 live births in the U.S., but it affects individuals in Japan in 1 in 20,000-40,000 cases. 1 in 40 Ashkenazi Jews have a BRCA mutation, this is a huge contrast from the general population in the United States where 1 in 400 people are affected. Ashkenazi Jews are at high risk of developing hereditary breast and ovarian cancer and it is recommended that they undergo both genetic testing to see if they have a mutation and regular screening for cancer.

== See also ==
- Family aggregation
