= XPG I protein domain =

XPG_I
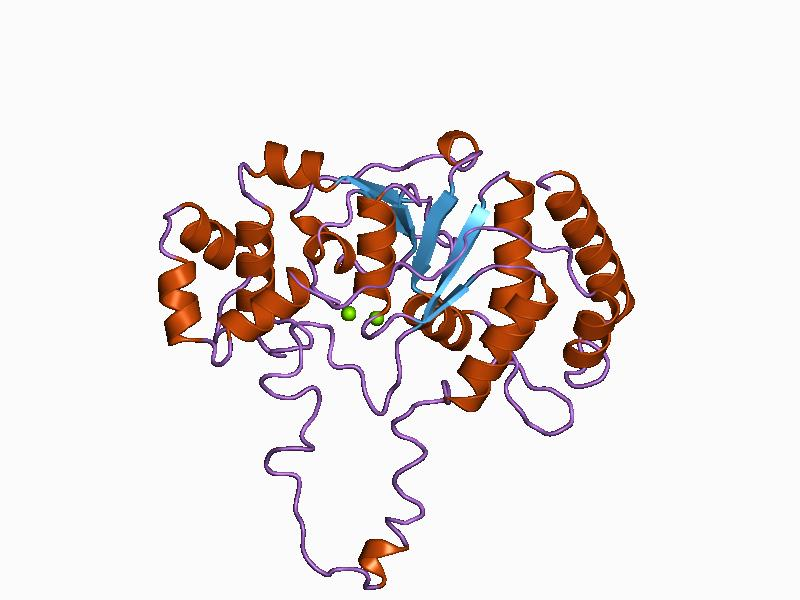
- flap endonuclease-1 from Methanococcus jannaschii

Identifiers
- Symbol: XPG_I
- Pfam: PF00867
- Pfam clan: CL0464
- InterPro: IPR006086
- PROSITE: PDOC00658
- SCOP2: 1a77 / SCOPe / SUPFAM
- CDD: cd09868
Available protein structures:
- PDB: IPR006086 PF00867 (ECOD; PDBsum)
- AlphaFold: IPR006086; PF00867

In molecular biology, the XPG-I is a protein domain found on Xeroderma Pigmentosum Complementation Group G (XPG) protein. The XPG protein is an endonuclease which repairs DNA damage caused by ultraviolet light (UV light). The XPG protein repairs DNA by a process called, Nucleotide excision repair. Mutations in the protein commonly cause Xeroderma Pigmentosum which often lead to skin cancer.

== Function ==
The function of the internal XPG (XPG-I) domain contains many of cysteine and glutamate amino acid residues that are frequently found in various enzyme active sites, DNA nucleases. The I domain, together with the N-terminal forms the catalytic domain that contains the active site.

== Mechanism ==
XPG cleaves the 5'-overhanging flap structure that is generated when DNA polymerase encounters the 5'-end of a downstream Okazaki fragment. It has both 5'endo-/exonuclease and 5'-pseudo-Y-endonuclease activities. Cleaves the junction between single and double-stranded regions of flap DNA. The endonuclease binds 2 magnesium ions per subunit, which probably participate in the reaction catalyzed by the enzyme. May bind an additional third magnesium ion after substrate binding.
