= Antimutagen =

Antimutagens are the agents that interfere with the mutagenicity of a substance. The interference can be in the form of prevention of the transformation of a promutagenic compound into actual active mutagen, inactivation, or otherwise the prevention of Mutagen-DNA reaction.

Antimutagens can be classified into: Desmutagens, that inactivate the chemical interactions before the mutagen attacks the genes and Bio-antimutagens, that stop the mutation process once after the genes are damaged by mutagens. There are a number of naturally occurring anti-mutagens that show their efficient action.

== Examples of antimutagens ==
=== Micronutrients ===
Nutrients such as vitamins and minerals are examples of micronutrients that are necessary for the proper maintenance of metabolism homeostasis in humans and other species. Micronutrients are also pointed to perform a role in genome stability acting as potential antimutagenic agents (see the examples below):

- Carotenoids: Induction of single break DNA repair by a rejoining mechanism and elimination of 8-oxoguanine which is usually resulted from oxidative stress in cells;
- Vitamins: Can induce cell programmed death via activation of p53 and increase of cellular mechanisms against strand breaks;
- Flavonoid polyphenolics: Found to perform antimutagenic activity through the increase of OGG1 expression, which is an enzyme responsible to remove 8-oxoguanine a mutagenic product created after cell's exposure to oxidative stress; Increase of single break repair by rejoining and induction of genes related to base and nucleotide excision repair such as XPA and XPC;
- Selenium: Induces programmed cell death via many signalling pathways as well as protects the cells against cell damage caused by oxidative stress.
- Magnesium: Essentially necessary for the process of nucleotide excision repair where in cells treated in absence of this micronutrient the repair was impaired.

=== UV blockers ===
Sunscreens are products commonly known by their capacity of protecting skin against sunburns. The active components present in sunscreens can vary, thus affecting the mechanism of protection against UV light, which can be done through absorption or reflection of UV energy. As UV light can cause mutations by DNA damaging, sunscreen is considered an antimutagenic compound as it blocks the action of the UV light to induce mutagenesis in cells, basically the sunscreen inhibit the penetration of the mutagen.

=== Tumor suppressor genes ===
These genes have the function of protecting cells against tumor-like behaviour, such as higher proliferative rates and unlimited growth. It is common to find those genes down regulated or even inactivated in tumor cells. Thus, tumor suppressor genes can be recognized as antimutagenic agents.

- TP53: This gene encodes for the p53 protein, which is known to act on the apoptotic signalling pathway and is also described to be important in the break excision repair of cells that had their DNA damaged. p53 is a transcription factor that is involved in the transcription of many genes, some of which related to the process of cell response against DNA damage. Some types of cancer show a high prevalence of lower or even absent levels of expression of this protein, sustaining its importance against mutagenesis.
- PTEN: PTEN is another gene considered a tumor suppressor and acts through the inactivation of the PI3K-AKT pathway that leads to cell growth and survival. In other words, this gene is important to cause the cell growth arrest avoiding posterior effects and consequences of mutagenesis.
