= Excinuclease =

Class of enzymes

Excision endonuclease, also known as excinuclease or UV-specific endonuclease, is a nuclease (enzyme) which excises a fragment of nucleotides during DNA repair. The excinuclease cuts out a fragment by hydrolyzing two phosphodiester bonds, one on either side of the lesion in the DNA. This process is part of "nucleotide excision repair", a mechanism that can fix specific types of damage to the DNA in the G1 phase of the eukaryotic cell cycle. Such damage may include thymine dimers created by UV rays as well as the bulky distortions in DNA caused by oxidized benzopyrenes from sources such as cigarette smoke.

A deficiency of excinuclease occurs in a rare autosomal recessive disease called xeroderma pigmentosum. This disease can cause light-skin, extreme freckling and facial lesions, as well as preventing the repair of pyrimidine dimers. Diagnosis of this disease is done by measuring the enzyme's level in white blood cells in a blood sample. Symptoms in children include extreme UV sensitivity, excessive freckling, multiple skin cancers and corneal ulcerations. Typically, these symptoms are seen during a child's first sun exposure.
