= XPG N terminus =

XPG N terminal domain
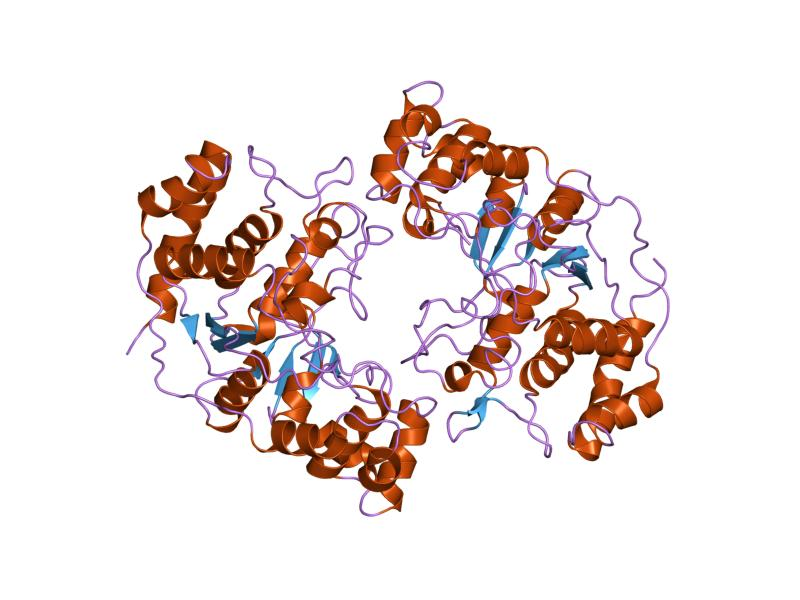
- Crystal structure of flap endonuclease-1 r42e mutant from Pyrococcus horikoshii

Identifiers
- Symbol: XPG_N
- Pfam: PF00752
- Pfam clan: CL0280
- InterPro: IPR006085
- PROSITE: PDOC00658
- SCOP2: 1a77 / SCOPe / SUPFAM
Available protein structures:
- PDB: IPR006085 PF00752 (ECOD; PDBsum)
- AlphaFold: IPR006085; PF00752

In molecular biology the protein domain XPG refers to, in this case, the N-terminus of XPG. The XPG protein can be corrected by a 133 kDa nuclear protein, XPGC. XPGC is an acidic protein that confers normal ultraviolet (UV) light resistance. It is a magnesium-dependent, single-strand DNA endonuclease that makes structure-specific endonucleolytic incisions in a DNA substrate containing a duplex region and single-stranded arms. XPGC cleaves one strand of the duplex at the border with the single-stranded region.

== Homology ==
XPG belongs to a family of proteins that includes:

- RAD2 from Saccharomyces cerevisiae (Baker's yeast) and rad13 from Schizosaccharomyces pombe (Fission yeast), which are single-stranded DNA endonucleases,;
- mouse and human FEN-1, a structure-specific endonuclease;
- RAD2 from fission yeast and RAD27 from budding yeast;
- fission yeast exo1, a 5'-3' double-stranded DNA exonuclease that may act in a pathway that corrects mismatched base pairs;
- yeast DHS1,
- yeast DIN7.

Sequence alignment of this family of proteins reveals that similarities are largely confined to two regions. The first is located at the N-terminal extremity (N-region) and corresponds to the first 95 to 105 amino acids. The second region is internal (I-region) and found towards the C terminus; it spans about 140 residues and contains a highly conserved core of 27 amino acids that includes a conserved pentapeptide (E-A-[DE]-A-[QS]). It is possible that the conserved acidic residues are involved in the catalytic mechanism of DNA excision repair in XPG. The amino acid linking the N- and I-regions are not conserved.

== Xeroderma pigmentosum ==
Xeroderma pigmentosum (XP) is a human autosomal recessive disease, characterised by a high incidence of sunlight-induced skin cancer. People's skin cells with this condition are hypersensitive to ultraviolet light, due to defects in the incision step of DNA excision repair. There are a minimum of seven genetic complementation groups involved in this pathway: XP-A to XP-G. XP-G is one of the most rare and phenotypically heterogeneous of XP, showing anything from slight to extreme dysfunction in DNA excision repair.
