= Somatic mutation and recombination tests =

Genotoxic assay in fruit fly

The somatic mutation and recombination tests (SMARTs) are in vivo genotoxicity tests performed in Drosophila melanogaster (Fruit fly). These fruit fly tests are a short-term test and a non-mammalian approach for in vivo testing of putative genotoxins found in the environment. D. melanogaster has a short lifespan, which allows for fast reproductive cycles and high-throughput genotoxicity testing. D. melanogaster also has around 75% functional orthologs of human disease-related genes, making it an attractive in vivo model for human research. The tests identify loss of heterozygosity for the specified genetic markers in heterozygous or trans-heterozygous adults using phenotypically observable genetic markers in adult tissues. Although diverse events like point mutations/deletions, nondisjunction, and homologous mitotic recombination might theoretically cause this loss of heterozygosity, nondisjunction processes are generally not relevant for most of the examined chemicals. SMARTs are two different tests that use the same genetic foundation, but target different adult tissues and are named accordingly: the wing-spot test and the eye-spot test.

== Background ==
In the developmental phase, larval structures and imaginal discs - clusters of diploid cells of undifferentiated epithelium- are formed in the embryo. The pupa emerges following the completion of the larval stages, and metamorphosis occurs as a result of systemic hormonal regulation, with histolysis of the larval organs and differentiation of the imaginal discs into adult components. When these imaginal discs are exposed to genotoxic substances genetic mutations occur due to possible DNA damage that can be inherited by the progeny cells during mitosis. The phenotypic forms of these genetic mutations can be observed in adult body forms, like the wings and the eyes, and thus can be examined using the wing-spot test and the eye-spot test, respectively. The loss of heterozygosity (LOH) for specific genetic markers in heterozygous individuals enables for visual scoring of DNA damage/genotoxicity in adult tissues

== Types ==
=== The wing-spot test ===
The wing-spot test in D. melanogaster was first described by Graf and Würgler. The wing-spot test determines for the induction of mutant spots that represent the loss of heterozygozity due to point mutation, deletion, nondisjunction, or mitotic recombination using the recessive genetic markers multiple wing hair (mwh) and flare-3 (flr3), located on chromosome number 3.

=== The eye spot test ===
The eye w/w+ SMART assay uses the X-chromosome white (w) gene as a recessive marker to monitor the presence of white clones in wild-type eyes, which indicate the occurrence of loss of heterozygosity at the white locus due to point mutations and/or deletions, as well as nondisjunction and homologous mitotic recombination in w/w+ somatic cells of Drosophila in vivo

== Applications ==
These tests are particularly effective instruments for analyzing (in vivo) the potential genotoxicity of chemicals in the somatic cells of a higher eukaryotic organism as they detect primarily the production of gene mutation and homologous recombination. It's worth noting that measuring mitotic recombination in somatic cells is important for genotoxicity screening since abnormal recombination activity is frequently linked to cancer. Indeed, these tests have been used to determine the genotoxicity of a variety of agents, including radiation, metals, chemicals, plant extracts/products, therapeutic drugs, food products and various types of pollutants and nanoparticles.They've also been employed to look for potential antimutagens.
