= XPC =

XPC or xpc may refer to:

- Pecheneg language, ISO 639-3 code 'xpc'
- Shuttle XPC, popular line of barebones computers and cases.
- SPEC XPC, the X Performance Characterization group working under the SPEC GPC group.
- Xeroderma pigmentosum, complementation group C, a human gene
- xPC Target, a product from MathWorks
- XPC Golf Clubs, a proprietary brand from Golfsmith
