= XPC-binding =

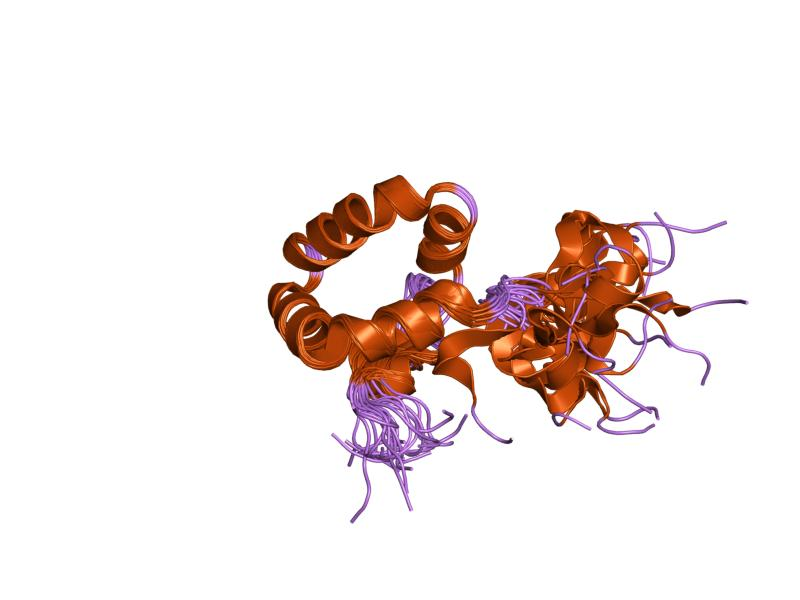
- solution structure of xpc binding domain of hhr23b

Identifiers
- Symbol: XPC-binding
- Pfam: PF09280
- InterPro: IPR015360
- SCOP2: 1pve / SCOPe / SUPFAM
Available protein structures:
- PDB: IPR015360 PF09280 (ECOD; PDBsum)
- AlphaFold: IPR015360; PF09280

In molecular biology, the XPC binding domain is thought to play a role in DNA damage discrimination and in the enhancement of cell survival. They bind specifically and directly to the xeroderma pigmentosum group C protein (XPC) to initiate nucleotide excision repair (NER). Members of this entry adopt a structure consisting of four alpha helices, arranged in an array.
