= UvrD =

UvrD may refer to:

- UvrABC endonuclease, an enzyme
- DNA helicase, an enzyme class
