= Mutation Frequency Decline =

Mutation Frequency Decline (mfd) is the gene which encodes the protein Mfd (also known as Transcription Repair Coupling Factor, TRCF). Mfd functions in transcription-coupled repair to remove a stalled RNA polymerase that has encountered DNA damage and is unable to continue translocating.

The protein is named after the fact that it reduces the chances of suppressor mutations in UV-irradiated cells (or rather, knockout cells show higher rates of such mutations). It does not reduce the chance of every kind of mutation. In fact, it seems to increase the chances of mutation in general, helping to evolve new traits such as antimicrobial resistance.

== Molecular function ==
Mfd utilizes ATP to translocate along DNA, most likely forcing RNA polymerase forward and ultimately dissociating it from the DNA template. Mfd also contains binding domains which recruit UvrA and trigger the associated nucleotide excision repair pathway and was initially discovered when its mutation led to a decrease in mutation rates after irradiation by UV light. Structural studies of E. coli Mfd by X-ray crystallography have revealed that this molecule is autoinhibited for UvrA-binding in its apo form due to a "clamp" interaction between the N-terminal UvrB-homology module and the C-terminal domain.

In 2002, it was shown that Mfd may also re-initiate transcription at backtracked RNAP by forcing the polymerase forward and out of its backtracked state.

== Cellular consequence ==
=== Evolution of antibiotic resistance ===
In 2015, Merrikh Lab at University of Washington discovered that Mfd quickens the bacterial mutation process. This work researches ways to slow the rate of bacterial mutations and to block their evolution, in order to fight against antibiotic resistance.

In 2022, a small molecule inhibitor of Mfd was identified by the Merrikh lab. As expected, it slowed down the evolution of antibiotic resistance.

=== Tolerance of nitrogen monoxide ===
Animal immune systems try to kill bacteria in a number of ways, one being the release of nitrogen monoxide (NO). NO damages bacterial DNA, but some species can survive this attack by expressing Mfd.
