= DeSanctis–Cacchione syndrome =

- Other names: Xeroderma pigmentosum with neurologic manifestation
- DeSanctis–Cacchione syndrome is inherited in an autosomal recessive manner
- Specialty: Medical genetics

DeSanctis–Cacchione syndrome is a genetic disorder characterized by the skin and eye symptoms of xeroderma pigmentosum (XP) occurring in association with microcephaly, progressive intellectual disability, slowed growth and sexual development, deafness, choreoathetosis, ataxia and quadriparesis.

== Genetics ==
In at least some case, the gene lesion involves a mutation in the CSB gene.

It can be associated with ERCC6.

== See also ==
- Xeroderma pigmentosum
- List of cutaneous conditions
