= ERCC8 =

Protein-coding gene in humans

Identifiers
- Aliases: ERCC8, CKN1, CSA, UVSS2, excision repair cross-complementation group 8, ERCC excision repair 8, CSA ubiquitin ligase complex subunit
- External IDs: OMIM: 609412; MGI: 1919241; GeneCards: ERCC8
Available structures
PDB	Ortholog search: PDBe RCSB
PDB	List of PDB id codes 4A11

Gene location (Human)
Chr.	Chromosome 5 (human)
Band	5q12.1	Start	60,866,454 bp
Band	5q12.1	End	60,945,073 bp

Gene location (Mouse)
Chr.	Chromosome 13 (mouse)
Band	13|13 D2.1	Start	108,295,265 bp
Band	13|13 D2.1	End	108,331,898 bp
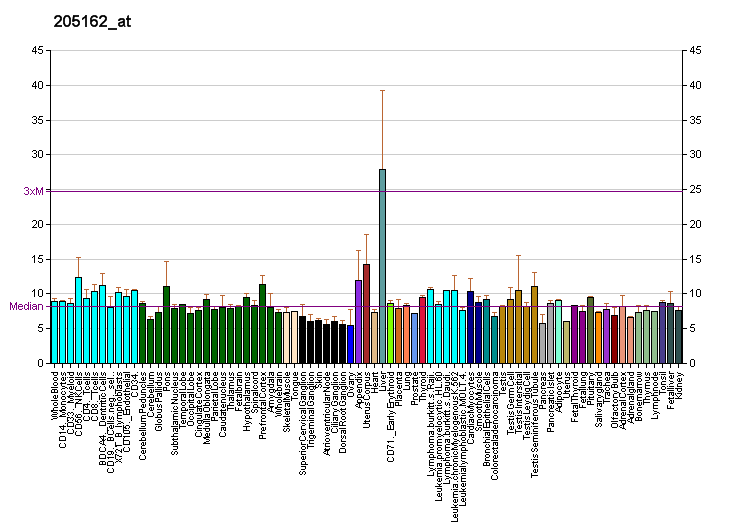
RNA expression pattern
Bgee	Human / Mouse (ortholog); Top expressed in: ventricular zone; gonad; ganglionic eminence; monocyte; Achilles tendon; stromal cell of endometrium; testicle; islet of Langerhans; rectum; left lobe of thyroid gland / Top expressed in: spermatocyte; spermatid; lumbar spinal ganglion; epithelium of small intestine; embryo; seminiferous tubule; embryo; epiblast; fetal liver hematopoietic progenitor cell; ventricular zone; More reference expression data
BioGPS	More reference expression data
Gene ontology
Molecular function	ATP-dependent activity, acting on DNA; DNA helicase activity; ubiquitin-protein transferase activity; protein binding; protein-containing complex binding
Cellular component	nucleoplasm; nucleotide-excision repair complex; nuclear matrix; Cul4A-RING E3 ubiquitin ligase complex; nucleus; Cul4-RING E3 ubiquitin ligase complex; cytoplasm; perikaryon; protein-containing complex
Biological process	response to X-ray; protein polyubiquitination; positive regulation of DNA repair; proteasome-mediated ubiquitin-dependent protein catabolic process; protein ubiquitination; protein autoubiquitination; transcription-coupled nucleotide-excision repair; response to oxidative stress; response to UV; cellular response to DNA damage stimulus; nucleotide-excision repair; DNA repair; post-translational protein modification; response to auditory stimulus; response to organic cyclic compound; DNA duplex unwinding
Sources:Amigo / QuickGO
Orthologs
Databases	NCBI: entry; OMA: entry
Species	Human	Mouse
Entrez	1161	71991
Ensembl	ENSG00000049167	ENSMUSG00000021694
UniProt	Q13216	Q8CFD5
RefSeq (mRNA)	NM_001290285; NM_000082; NM_001007233; NM_001007234	NM_028042; NM_001362403
RefSeq (protein)	NP_000073; NP_001007234; NP_001007235; NP_001277214	NP_082318; NP_001349332
Location (UCSC)	Chr 5: 60.87 – 60.95 Mb	Chr 13: 108.3 – 108.33 Mb
PubMed search
- Wikidata
View/Edit Human	View/Edit Mouse

DNA excision repair protein ERCC-8 is a protein that in humans is encoded by the ERCC8 gene.

This gene encodes a WD repeat protein, which interacts with the Cockayne syndrome type B (CSB) and p44 proteins, the latter being a subunit of the RNA polymerase II transcription factor II H. Mutations in this gene have been identified in patients with the hereditary disease Cockayne syndrome (CS). CS is an accelerated aging disorder characterized by photosensitivity, impaired development and multi-system progressive degeneration. The CS cells are abnormally sensitive to ultraviolet radiation and are defective in the repair of transcriptionally active genes. Multiple alternatively spliced transcript variants encoding different isoforms have been found for this gene.

CS arises from germline mutations in either of two genes CSA(ERCC8) or CSB(ERCC6). CSA mutations generally give rise to a more moderate form of CS than CSB mutations. Mutations in the CSA gene account for about 20% of CS cases.

== Function ==
CSA and CSB proteins are thought to function in transcription and DNA repair, most notably in transcription-coupled nucleotide excision repair. CSA and CSB-deficient cells exhibit a lack of preferential repair of UV-induced cyclobutane pyrimidine dimers in actively transcribed genes, consistent with a failed transcription coupled nucleotide excision repair response. Within the cell, the CSA protein localizes to sites of DNA damage, particularly inter-strand cross-links, double-strand breaks and some mono-adducts.

== Interactions ==
The ERCC8 gene has been shown to interact with XAB2.
