= UvrABC endonuclease =

Family of enzyme complexes

UvrABC system protein A

Identifiers
- Organism: Escherichia coli (strain K12)
- Symbol: uvrA
- Entrez: 948559
- RefSeq (Prot): NP_418482.1
- UniProt: P0A698

Other data
- EC number: 3.6.1.3
- Chromosome: genomic: 4.27 - 4.27 Mb
Search for
- Structures: Swiss-model
- Domains: InterPro

UvrABC system protein B

Identifiers
- Organism: Escherichia coli (strain K12)
- Symbol: uvrB
- Entrez: 945385
- RefSeq (Prot): NP_415300.1
- UniProt: P0A8F8

Other data
- Chromosome: genomic: 0.81 - 0.82 Mb
Search for
- Structures: Swiss-model
- Domains: InterPro

UvrABC system protein C

Identifiers
- Organism: Escherichia coli (strain K12)
- Symbol: uvrC
- Entrez: 947203
- RefSeq (Prot): NP_416423.4
- UniProt: P0A8G0

Other data
- Chromosome: genomic: 1.99 - 1.99 Mb
Search for
- Structures: Swiss-model
- Domains: InterPro

UvrABC endonuclease is a multienzyme complex in bacteria involved in DNA repair by nucleotide excision repair, and it is, therefore, sometimes called an excinuclease. This UvrABC repair process, sometimes called the short-patch process, involves the removal of twelve nucleotides where a DNA damage has occurred followed by a DNA polymerase, replacing these aberrant nucleotides with the correct nucleotides and completing the DNA repair. The subunits for this enzyme are encoded in the uvrA, uvrB, and uvrC genes. This enzyme complex is able to repair many different types of damage, including cyclobutyl dimer formation.

== Mechanism ==
1. Two UvrA proteins form a homodimer (UvrA_{2}) and they both have ATPase/GTPase activity.
2. Two UvrB proteins form a homodimer (UvrB_{2}).
3. The UvrA homodimer binds with a UvrB homodimer (UvrA_{2}B_{2}) and forms a complex that is able to detect DNA damage. The UvrA dimer functions as the unit responsible for the detection of DNA damage, probably through a mechanism of detecting distortions in the DNA double helix.
4. Upon binding of the UvrA_{2}B_{2} complex to a putative damaged site, the DNA wraps around UvrB
5. The UvrA dimer leaves and a UvrC protein comes in and binds to the UvrB and, hence, forms a new UvrBC complex.
6. UvrC is responsible for cleaving the nucleotides either side of the DNA damage. It cleaves a phosphodiester bond four nucleotides downstream of the DNA damage, and cleaves a phosphodiester bond eight nucleotides upstream of the DNA damage and creates a twelve nucleotide excised segment.
7. DNA helicase II (sometimes called UvrD) then comes in and removes the excised segment by removing the base pairing. The UvrB still remains in place even though UvrC has disassociated at this stage, as UvrB may be involved to prevent the reannealing of the excised DNA.
8. DNA polymerase I comes in and fills in the correct nucleotides sequence, kicking off UvrB in the process, and the last phosphodiester bond is completed by DNA ligase.

Although most of the studies on the UvrABC endonuclease were carried out with the gram negative bacterium Escherichia coli, similar studies have also been reported for the archaeal bacterium Halobacterium sp. NRC-1. Investigation of DNA repair in this archaeal halobacterium is important for understanding the diversity and evolution of DNA repair systems generally. In Halobacterium sp. NRC-1, homologs of the E. coli bacterial nucleotide excision repair genes uvrA, uvrB and uvrC are required tor the removal of UV damages (in the absence of photoreactivating light).

== See also ==
- DNA repair
- endonuclease
- Nucleotide excision repair
- DNA
