= XAB2 =

Protein-coding gene in the species Homo sapiens

Identifiers
- Aliases: XAB2, HCNP, HCRN, NTC90, SYF1, XPA binding protein 2
- External IDs: OMIM: 610850; MGI: 1914689; GeneCards: XAB2

Gene location (Human)
Chr.	Chromosome 19 (human)
Band	19p13.2	Start	7,619,525 bp
Band	19p13.2	End	7,629,545 bp

Gene location (Mouse)
Chr.	Chromosome 8 (mouse)
Band	8 A1.1|8 1.92 cM	Start	3,658,421 bp
Band	8 A1.1|8 1.92 cM	End	3,671,316 bp
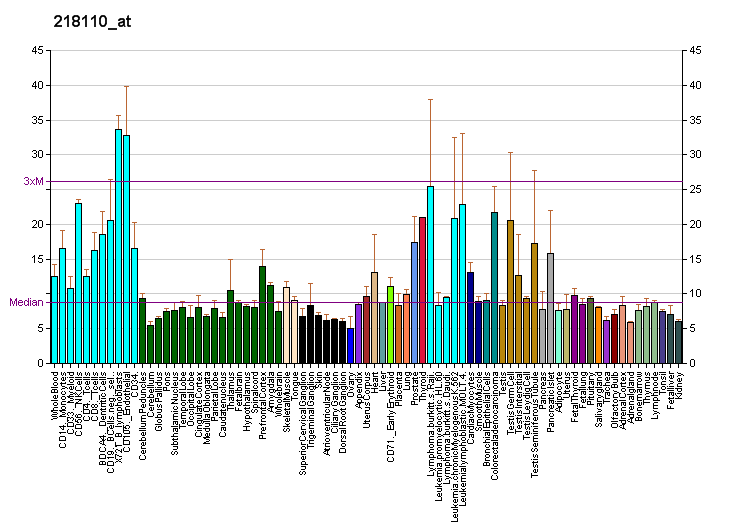
RNA expression pattern
Bgee	Human / Mouse (ortholog); Top expressed in: left ovary; granulocyte; right ovary; skin of leg; body of uterus; right uterine tube; canal of the cervix; right lobe of thyroid gland; left lobe of thyroid gland; skin of abdomen / Top expressed in: gastrula; submandibular gland; internal carotid artery; external carotid artery; Rostral migratory stream; Gonadal ridge; vestibular membrane of cochlear duct; maxillary prominence; epiblast; granulocyte; More reference expression data
BioGPS	More reference expression data
Gene ontology
Molecular function	protein binding
Cellular component	catalytic step 2 spliceosome; membrane; nucleoplasm; spliceosomal complex; nucleus; Prp19 complex; prespliceosome; catalytic step 1 spliceosome; post-mRNA release spliceosomal complex; U2-type catalytic step 2 spliceosome
Biological process	RNA processing; mRNA processing; transcription, DNA-templated; cellular response to DNA damage stimulus; RNA splicing; cerebral cortex development; transcription-coupled nucleotide-excision repair; blastocyst development; DNA repair; mRNA splicing, via spliceosome; generation of catalytic spliceosome for first transesterification step
Sources:Amigo / QuickGO
Orthologs
Databases	NCBI: entry; OMA: entry
Species	Human	Mouse
Entrez	56949	67439
Ensembl	ENSG00000076924	ENSMUSG00000019470
UniProt	Q9HCS7	Q9DCD2
RefSeq (mRNA)	NM_020196	NM_026156
RefSeq (protein)	NP_064581	NP_080432
Location (UCSC)	Chr 19: 7.62 – 7.63 Mb	Chr 8: 3.66 – 3.67 Mb
PubMed search
- Wikidata
View/Edit Human	View/Edit Mouse

Pre-mRNA-splicing factor SYF1 is a protein that in humans is encoded by the XAB2 gene.

== Interactions ==
XAB2 has been shown to interact with ERCC8 and XPA.
