= RAD23B =

Protein-coding gene in the species Homo sapiens

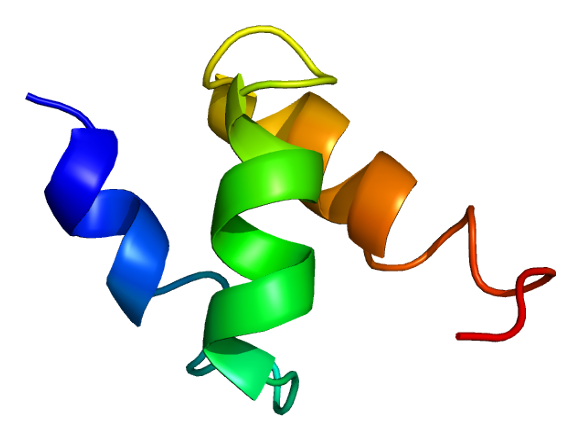

Identifiers
- Aliases: RAD23B, HHR23B, HR23B, P58, RAD23 homolog B, nucleotide excision repair protein
- External IDs: OMIM: 600062; MGI: 105128; GeneCards: RAD23B
Available structures
PDB	Ortholog search: PDBe RCSB
PDB	List of PDB id codes 1P1A, 1PVE, 1UEL

Gene location (Human)
Chr.	Chromosome 9 (human)
Band	9q31.2	Start	107,283,137 bp
Band	9q31.2	End	107,332,192 bp

Gene location (Mouse)
Chr.	Chromosome 4 (mouse)
Band	4|4 B3	Start	55,350,043 bp
Band	4|4 B3	End	55,392,237 bp
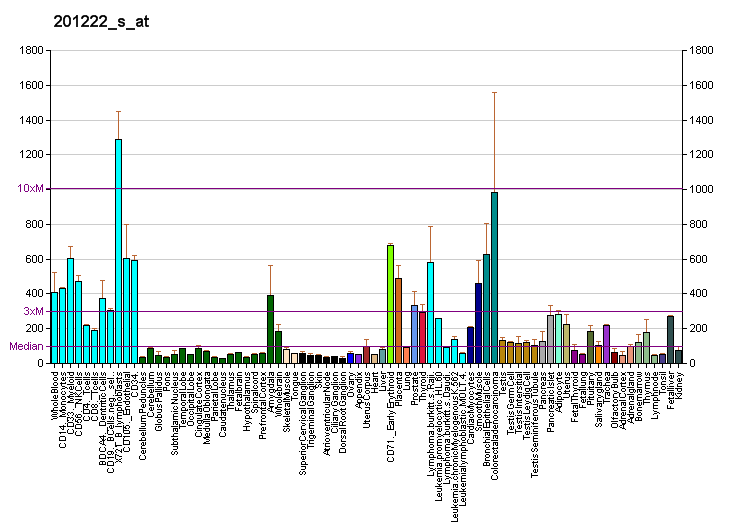

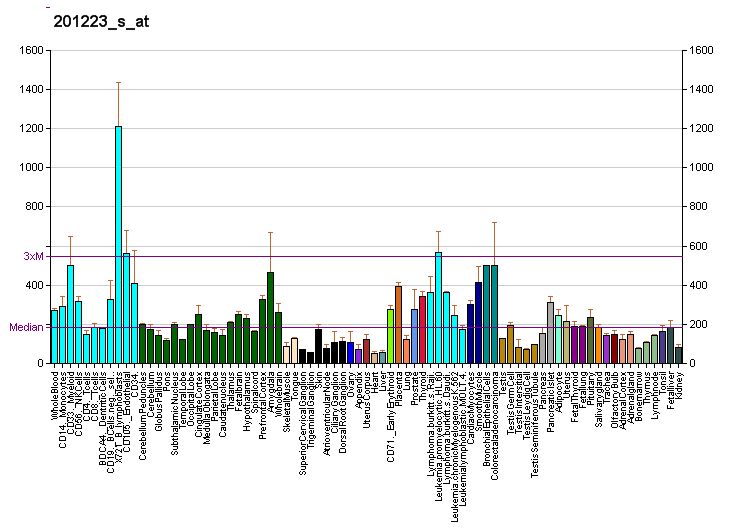
RNA expression pattern
Bgee	Human / Mouse (ortholog); Top expressed in: corpus epididymis; Skeletal muscle tissue of rectus abdominis; Skeletal muscle tissue of biceps brachii; human penis; mucosa of sigmoid colon; triceps brachii muscle; glutes; jejunum; mucosa of pharynx; body of tongue / Top expressed in: genital tubercle; tail of embryo; mandibular prominence; atrium; somite; maxillary prominence; seminiferous tubule; Gonadal ridge; transitional epithelium of urinary bladder; epiblast; More reference expression data
BioGPS	More reference expression data
Gene ontology
Molecular function	single-stranded DNA binding; damaged DNA binding; polyubiquitin modification-dependent protein binding; protein binding; ubiquitin binding; proteasome binding
Cellular component	XPC complex; proteasome complex; nucleus; nucleoplasm; cytoplasm; cytosol
Biological process	cellular response to DNA damage stimulus; nucleotide-excision repair; global genome nucleotide-excision repair; nucleotide-excision repair, DNA damage recognition; spermatogenesis; embryonic organ development; proteasome-mediated ubiquitin-dependent protein catabolic process; regulation of proteasomal ubiquitin-dependent protein catabolic process; DNA repair; nucleotide-excision repair, preincision complex assembly; protein folding; protein deubiquitination; cellular response to interleukin-7; nucleotide-excision repair, DNA duplex unwinding
Sources:Amigo / QuickGO
Orthologs
Databases	NCBI: entry; OMA: entry
Species	Human	Mouse
Entrez	5887	19359
Ensembl	ENSG00000119318	ENSMUSG00000028426
UniProt	P54727; Q5W0S4	P54728
RefSeq (mRNA)	NM_002874; NM_001244713; NM_001244724	NM_009011
RefSeq (protein)	NP_001231642; NP_001231653; NP_002865	NP_033037
Location (UCSC)	Chr 9: 107.28 – 107.33 Mb	Chr 4: 55.35 – 55.39 Mb
PubMed search
- Wikidata
View/Edit Human	View/Edit Mouse

UV excision repair protein RAD23 homolog B is a protein that in humans is encoded by the RAD23B gene.

== Function ==
The protein encoded by this gene is one of two human homologs of Saccharomyces cerevisiae Rad23, a protein involved in nucleotide excision repair (NER). This protein was found to be a component of the protein complex that specifically complements the NER defect of xeroderma pigmentosum group C (XP-c) cell extracts in vitro. This protein was also shown to interact with, and elevate the nucleotide excision activity of 3-methyladenine-DNA glycosylase (MPG), which suggested a role in DNA damage recognition in base excision repair. This protein contains an N-terminal ubiquitin-like domain, which was reported to interact with 26S proteasome, and thus this protein may be involved in the ubiquitin mediated proteolytic pathway in cells.

== Role in DNA repair ==
The complex of XPC-RAD23B is the initial damage recognition factor in global genomic nucleotide excision repair (GG-NER). XPC-RAD23B recognizes a wide variety of lesions that thermodynamically destabilize DNA duplexes, including UV-induced photoproducts (cyclopyrimidine dimers and 6-4 photoproducts), adducts formed by environmental mutagens such as benzo[a]pyrene or various aromatic amines, certain oxidative endogenous lesions such as cyclopurines and adducts formed by cancer chemotherapeutic drugs such as cisplatin. The presence of XPC-RAD23B is required for assembly of the other core NER factors and progression through the NER pathway both in vitro and in vivo. Although most studies have been performed with XPC-RAD23B, it is part of a trimeric complex with centrin-2, a calcium-binding protein of the calmodulin family.

== Epigenetic repression ==
The protein expression level of RAD23B can be epigenetically repressed, either by promoter methylation of the RAD23B gene or by either of two microRNAs (miR-744-3p or miR-373).

== Deficiency of RAD23B in cancer ==
A deficiency in expression of a DNA repair gene increases the risk for cancer (see Deficient DNA repair in carcinogenesis). The expression of RAD23B is reduced in tumor tissue of women with breast cancer. A low percentage of RAD23B positive nuclei in high grade breast cancer was also observed.

RAD23B was substantially reduced by promoter methylation in a cell line derived from multiple myeloma. and reduced by promoter methylation in a small proportion of non-small cell lung cancer (NSCLC) tumours.

RAD23B appears to be one of 26 DNA repair genes that are epigenetically repressed in various cancers (see Cancer epigenetics).

== Interactions ==
RAD23B has been shown to interact with PSMD4 and Ataxin 3.
