= XPA =

Protein-coding gene in the species Homo sapiens

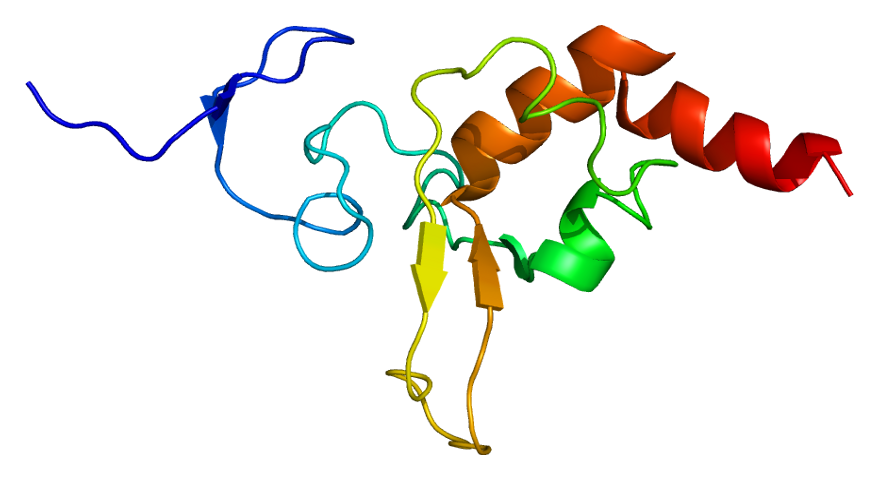

Identifiers
- Aliases: XPA, XP1, XPAC, xeroderma pigmentosum, complementation group A, DNA damage recognition and repair factor
- External IDs: OMIM: 611153; MGI: 99135; GeneCards: XPA
Available structures
PDB	Ortholog search: PDBe RCSB
PDB	List of PDB id codes 1D4U, 1XPA, 2JNW

Gene location (Mouse)
Chr.	Chromosome 4 (mouse)
Band	4 B1|4 24.49 cM	Start	46,155,347 bp
Band	4 B1|4 24.49 cM	End	46,196,311 bp
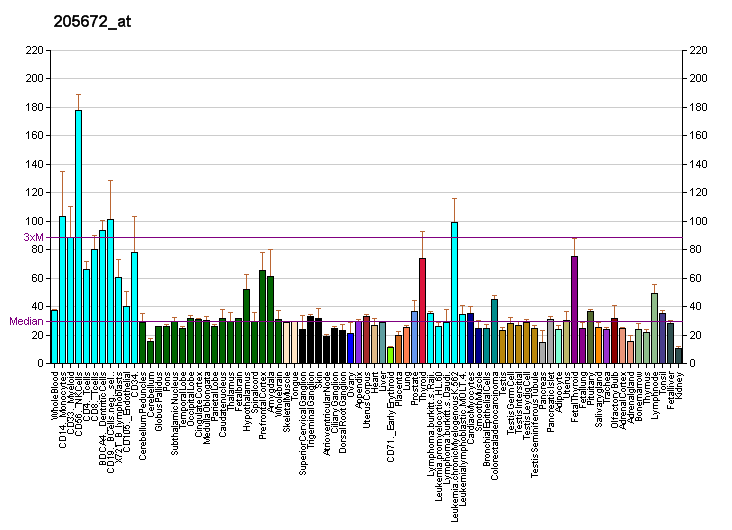
RNA expression pattern
Bgee	Human / Mouse (ortholog); n/a / Top expressed in: granulocyte; genital tubercle; neural layer of retina; ventricular zone; right kidney; ganglionic eminence; muscle of thigh; embryo; tail of embryo; proximal tubule
BioGPS	More reference expression data
Gene ontology
Molecular function	metal ion binding; protein domain specific binding; protein homodimerization activity; DNA binding; protein binding; damaged DNA binding
Cellular component	intercellular bridge; DNA replication factor A complex; nucleotide-excision repair factor 1 complex; nucleus; nucleoplasm; cytoplasm
Biological process	nucleotide-excision repair, DNA incision; intrinsic apoptotic signaling pathway in response to DNA damage; transcription-coupled nucleotide-excision repair; response to oxidative stress; cellular response to DNA damage stimulus; response to auditory stimulus; multicellular organism growth; global genome nucleotide-excision repair; response to toxic substance; response to UV; nucleotide-excision repair, preincision complex assembly; nucleotide-excision repair; nucleotide-excision repair, DNA incision, 5'-to lesion; nucleotide-excision repair involved in interstrand cross-link repair; UV-damage excision repair; base-excision repair; nucleotide-excision repair, preincision complex stabilization; nucleotide-excision repair, DNA damage recognition; DNA repair; UV protection; protein localization to nucleus; regulation of autophagy; nucleotide-excision repair, DNA duplex unwinding; nucleotide-excision repair, DNA incision, 3'-to lesion
Sources:Amigo / QuickGO
Orthologs
Databases	NCBI: entry; OMA: entry
Species	Human	Mouse
Entrez	7507	22590
Ensembl	ENSG00000136936	ENSMUSG00000028329
UniProt	P23025	Q64267
RefSeq (mRNA)	NM_000380	NM_011728
RefSeq (protein)	NP_000371; NP_001341904	NP_035858
Location (UCSC)	n/a	Chr 4: 46.16 – 46.2 Mb
PubMed search
- Wikidata
View/Edit Human	View/Edit Mouse

DNA repair protein complementing XP-A cells (or XPA) is a protein that in humans is encoded by the XPA gene.

== Function ==
Nucleotide excision repair (NER) is a major pathway for repairing a variety of bulky DNA damages including those introduced by UV irradiation. The XPA protein appears to play a key role in NER at sites of damage as a scaffold for other repair proteins in order to ensure that the damages are appropriately excised.

XPA binds with affinity to irradiated DNA, those with "bulky adducts and cisplatin lesions, and DNA duplexes with loops and bulges.

Among the repair proteins with which XPA interacts is a protein complex (including the ERCC1 protein) that is capable of incising DNA at sites of damage.

Xpa mutant individuals often show the severe clinical symptoms of xeroderma pigmentosum, a condition involving extreme sensitivity to sunlight and a high incidence of skin cancer.

== Interactions ==
XPA has been shown to interact with ERCC1, Replication protein A1 and XAB2.

XPA_{4-97}, the N-terminus, has binding regions for Replication protein A 34 and ERCC1. The C-terminal domain XPA_{226-273} and Transcription factor II H interact. The DNA-binding domain is found in the central domain (XPA_{98-219}).
