= ERCC5 =

Protein-coding gene in the species Homo sapiens

Identifiers
- Aliases: ERCC5, COFS3, ERCM2, UVDR, XPG, XPGC, ERCC5-201, excision repair cross-complementation group 5, ERCC excision repair 5, endonuclease
- External IDs: OMIM: 133530; MGI: 103582; GeneCards: ERCC5
Available structures
PDB	Ortholog search: PDBe RCSB
PDB	List of PDB id codes 5EKF, 5EKG

Gene location (Human)
Chr.	Chromosome 13 (human)
Band	13q33.1	Start	102,845,831 bp
Band	13q33.1	End	102,875,995 bp

Gene location (Mouse)
Chr.	Chromosome 1 (mouse)
Band	1 C1.1|1 23.55 cM	Start	44,186,904 bp
Band	1 C1.1|1 23.55 cM	End	44,220,420 bp
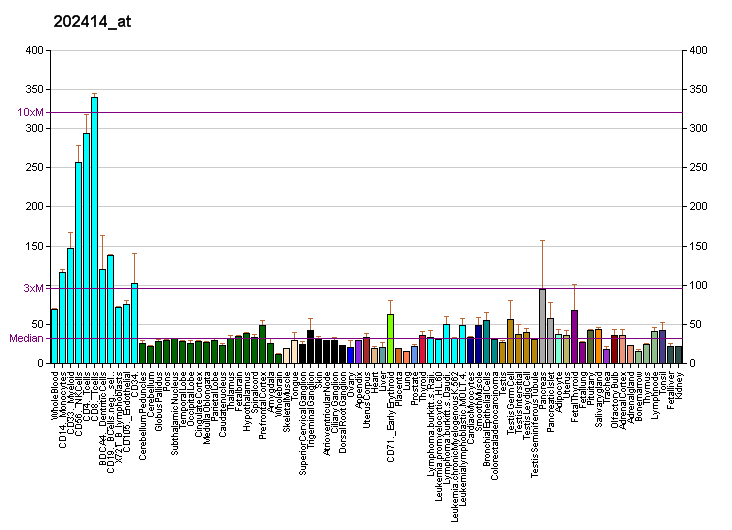
RNA expression pattern
Bgee	Human / Mouse (ortholog); Top expressed in: granulocyte; Achilles tendon; body of pancreas; skin of leg; skin of abdomen; right lobe of liver; anterior pituitary; right lung; mucosa of transverse colon; tibial nerve / Top expressed in: Rostral migratory stream; genital tubercle; tail of embryo; stroma of bone marrow; ganglionic eminence; ventricular zone; neural layer of retina; corneal stroma; ciliary body; supraoptic nucleus; More reference expression data
BioGPS	More reference expression data
Gene ontology
Molecular function	DNA binding; protein homodimerization activity; hydrolase activity, acting on ester bonds; protein N-terminus binding; bubble DNA binding; metal ion binding; single-stranded DNA binding; protein binding; catalytic activity; nuclease activity; endonuclease activity; double-stranded DNA binding; endodeoxyribonuclease activity; hydrolase activity; RNA polymerase II complex binding; protein-containing complex binding
Cellular component	RNA polymerase II, holoenzyme; transcription factor TFIIH holo complex; DNA replication factor A complex; nucleus; nucleoplasm; nucleotide-excision repair complex
Biological process	negative regulation of apoptotic process; cellular response to DNA damage stimulus; UV protection; transcription-coupled nucleotide-excision repair; nucleotide-excision repair, DNA incision; response to UV; response to UV-C; nucleotide-excision repair; nucleotide-excision repair, preincision complex stabilization; DNA repair; nucleotide-excision repair, preincision complex assembly; nucleotide-excision repair, DNA incision, 5'-to lesion; nucleotide-excision repair, DNA incision, 3'-to lesion
Sources:Amigo / QuickGO
Orthologs
Databases	NCBI: entry; OMA: entry
Species	Human	Mouse
Entrez	2073	22592
Ensembl	ENSG00000134899	ENSMUSG00000026048
UniProt	P28715	P35689
RefSeq (mRNA)	NM_000123	NM_011729
RefSeq (protein)	NP_000114	n/a
Location (UCSC)	Chr 13: 102.85 – 102.88 Mb	Chr 1: 44.19 – 44.22 Mb
PubMed search
- Wikidata
View/Edit Human	View/Edit Mouse

DNA repair protein complementing XP-G cells is a protein that in humans is encoded by the ERCC5 gene.

== Function ==
Excision repair cross-complementing rodent repair deficiency, complementation group 5 (xeroderma pigmentosum, complementation group G) is involved in excision repair of UV-induced DNA damage. Mutations cause Cockayne syndrome, which is characterized by severe growth defects, mental retardation, and cachexia. Multiple alternatively spliced transcript variants encoding distinct isoforms have been described, but the biological validity of all variants has not been determined.

Mutations in ERCC5 cause arthrogryposis.

XPG is a structure specific endonuclease that incises DNA at the 3' side of the damaged nucleotide during nucleotide excision repair.

== Syndromes ==
Mutational defects in the Ercc5(Xpg) gene can cause either the cancer-prone condition xeroderma pigmentosum (XP) alone, or in combination with the severe neurodevelopmental disorder Cockayne syndrome (CS) or the infantile lethal cerebro-oculo-facio-skeletal syndrome.

== Mouse model ==
An Ercc5(Xpg) mutant mouse model presented features of premature aging including cachexia and osteoporosis with pronounced degenerative phenotypes in both liver and brain. These mutant mice developed a multi-system premature aging degenerative phenotype that appears to strengthen the link between DNA damage and aging. (see DNA damage theory of aging).

Dietary restriction, which extends lifespan of wild-type mice, also substantially increased the lifespan of Ercc5(Xpg) mutant mice. Dietary restriction of the mutant mice, while delaying aging, also appeared to slow the accumulation of genome wide DNA damage and to preserve transcriptional output, thus contributing to improved cell viability.

== Interactions ==
ERCC5 has been shown to interact with ERCC2.
