= Nucleotide excision repair =

DNA repair mechanism

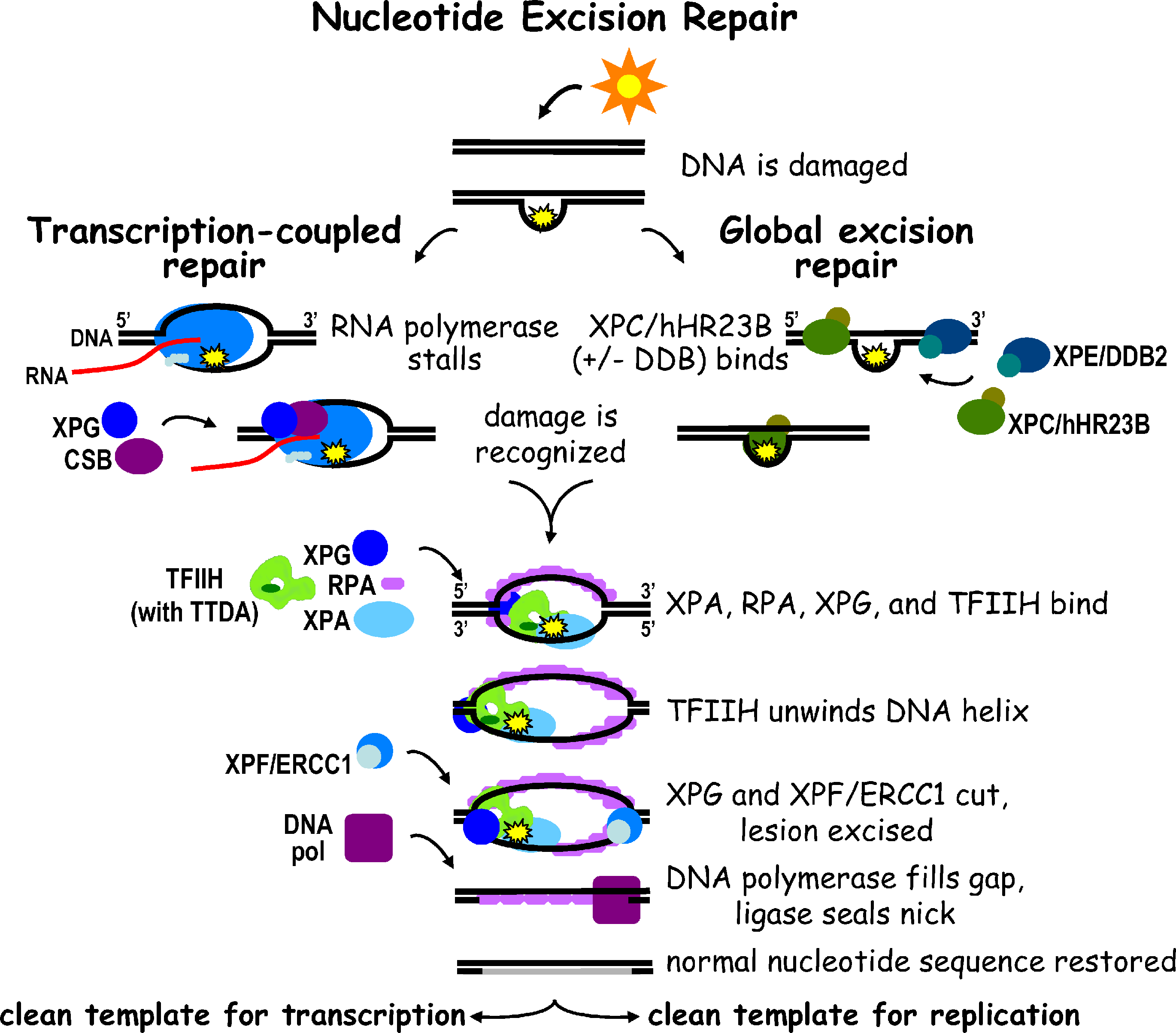
Diagram of both the TC-NER and GG-NER pathways. The two pathways differ only in initial DNA damage recognition.

Nucleotide excision repair is a DNA repair mechanism. DNA damage occurs constantly because of chemicals (e.g. intercalating agents), radiation and other mutagens. Three excision repair pathways exist to repair single stranded DNA damage: Nucleotide excision repair (NER), base excision repair (BER), and DNA mismatch repair (MMR). While the BER pathway can recognize specific non-bulky lesions in DNA, it can correct only damaged bases that are removed by specific glycosylases. Similarly, the MMR pathway only targets mismatched Watson-Crick base pairs.

Nucleotide excision repair (NER) is a particularly important excision mechanism that removes DNA damage induced by ultraviolet light (UV). UV DNA damage results in bulky DNA adducts — these adducts are mostly thymine dimers and 6,4-photoproducts. Recognition of the damage leads to removal of a short single-stranded DNA segment that contains the lesion. The undamaged single-stranded DNA remains and DNA polymerase uses it as a template to synthesize a short complementary sequence. Final ligation to complete NER and form a double stranded DNA is carried out by DNA ligase. NER can be divided into two subpathways: global genomic NER (GG-NER or GGR) and transcription coupled NER (TC-NER or TCR). The two subpathways differ in how they recognize DNA damage but they share the same process for lesion incision, repair, and ligation.

The importance of NER is evidenced by the severe human diseases that result from in-born genetic mutations of NER proteins. Xeroderma pigmentosum and Cockayne's syndrome are two examples of NER associated diseases.

== In eukaryotes ==
Nucleotide excision repair is more complex in eukaryotes than prokaryotes, which express enzymes like the photolyase. In humans and other placental animals, there are 9 major proteins involved in NER. Deficiencies in certain proteins leads to disease; protein names are associated with the disease. XPA, XPB, XPC, XPD, XPE, XPF, and XPG all derive from xeroderma pigmentosum and CSA and CSB represent proteins linked to Cockayne syndrome. Additionally, the proteins ERCC1, RPA, RAD23A, RAD23B, and others also participate in nucleotide excision repair. A more complete list of proteins involved in NER is found below.

Eukaryotic nucleotide excision repair can be divided into two subpathways: global genomic NER (GG-NER) and transcription coupled NER (TC-NER). Three different sets of proteins are involved in recognizing DNA damage for each subpathway. After damage recognition, the three subpathways converge for the steps of dual incision, repair, and ligation.

=== Damage recognition ===
==== Global genomic NER (GG-NER) ====
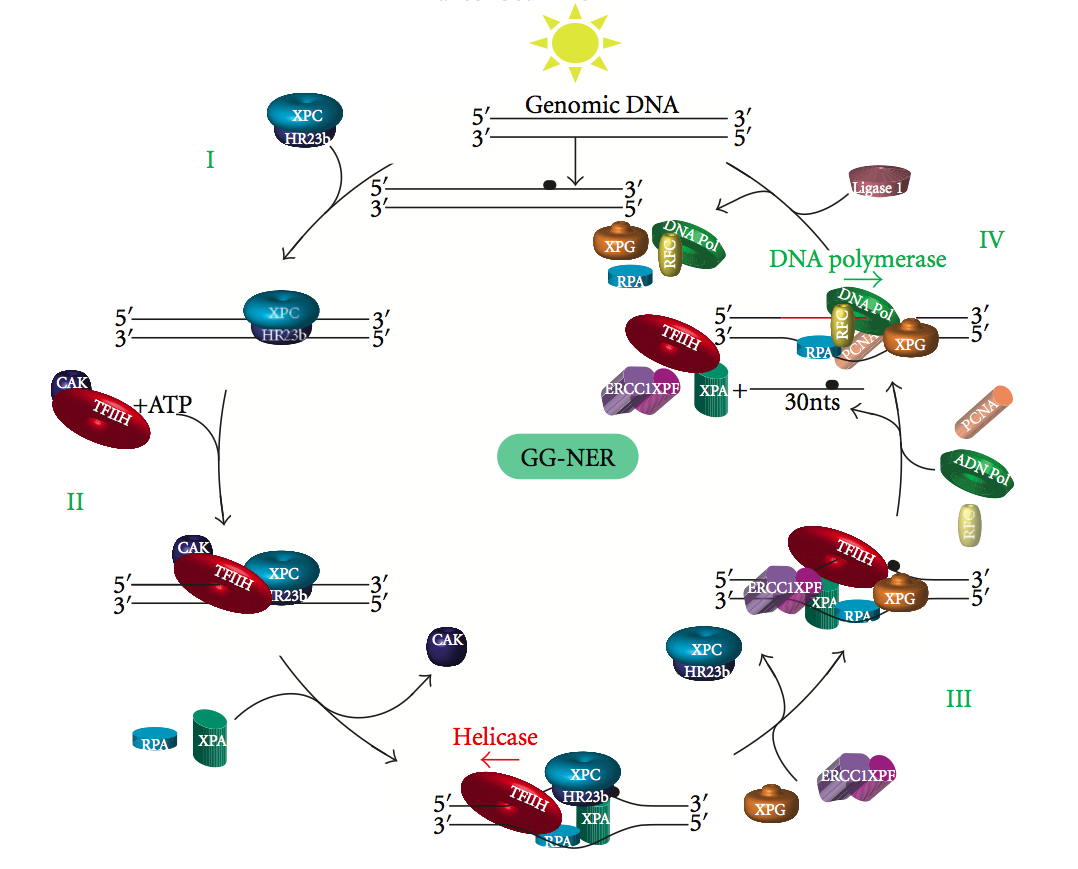
Schematic depicts binding of proteins involved with GG-NER.

Global genomic NER repairs damage in both transcribed and untranscribed DNA strands in active and inactive genes throughout the genome. This process is not dependent on transcription. This pathway employs several "damage sensing" proteins including the DNA-damage binding (DDB) and XPC-Rad23B complexes that constantly scan the genome and recognize helix distortions: the XPC-Rad23B complex is responsible for distortion recognition, while DDB1 and DDB2 (XPE) can also recognize some types of damage caused by UV light. Additionally, XPA performs a function in damage recognition that is as yet poorly defined. Upon identification of a damaged site, subsequent repair proteins are then recruited to the damaged DNA to verify presence of DNA damage, excise the damaged DNA surrounding the lesion then fill in the repair patch.

===== GG-NER associated diseases =====
Mutations in GG-NER machinery are responsible for multiple genetic disorders including:

- Xeroderma pigmentosum (XP): severe photosensitivity, high cancer rates in areas of the body exposed to the sun (e.g. skin)

==== Transcription coupled repair (TC-NER) ====
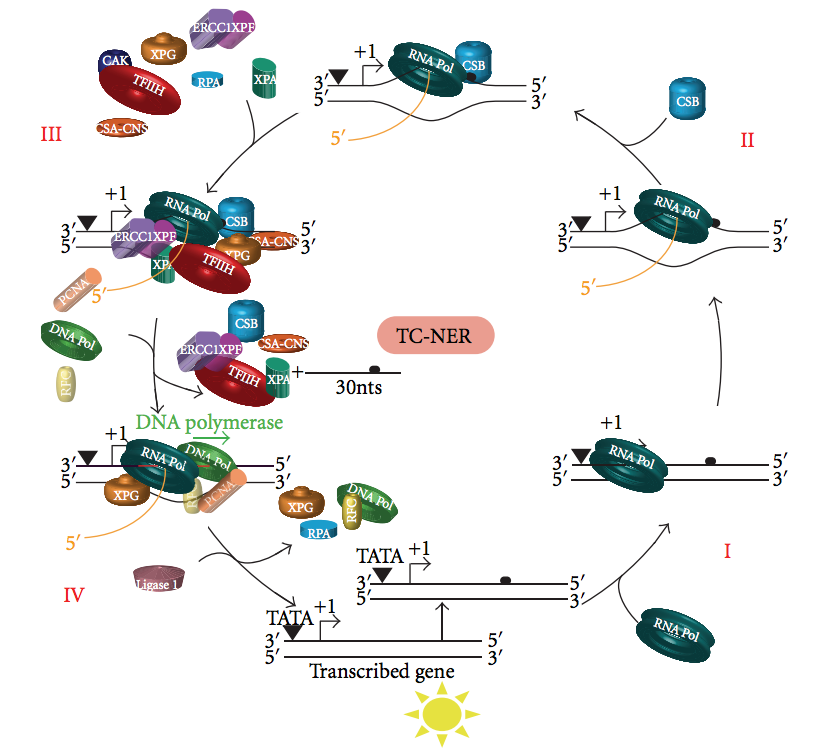
Schematic depicts binding of proteins involved with TC-NER.

At any given time, most of the genome in an organism is not undergoing transcription; there is a difference in NER efficiency between transcriptionally silent and transcriptionally active regions of the genome. For many types of lesions, NER repairs the transcribed strands of transcriptionally active genes faster than it repairs nontranscribed strands and transcriptionally silent DNA.

TC-NER and GG-NER differ only in the initial steps of DNA damage recognition. The principal difference between TC-NER and GG-NER is that TC-NER does not require XPC or DDB proteins for distortion recognition in mammalian cells. Instead TC-NER initiates when RNA polymerase stalls at a lesion in DNA: the blocked RNA polymerase serves as a damage recognition signal, which replaces the need for the distortion recognition properties of the XPC-RAD23B and DDB complexes. CS proteins (CSA and CSB) bind some types of DNA damage instead of XPC-Rad23B.

Other repair mechanisms are possible but less accurate and efficient.

===== TC-NER associated diseases =====
TC-NER initiates when RNA polymerase stalls at a lesion in DNA, whereupon protein complexes help move the polymerase backwards. Mutations in TC-NER machinery are responsible for multiple genetic disorders including:

- Trichothiodystrophy (TTD): some individuals are photosensitive, ichthyosis, mental/physical retardation
- Cockayne syndrome (CS): photosensitivity, intellectual disability, progeria-like features, microcephaly

=== Dual incision ===
Transcription factor II H (TFIIH) is the key enzyme involved in dual excision. TFIIH and XPG are first recruited to the site of DNA damage (XPG stabilizes TFIIH). The TFIIH subunits of XPD and XPB act as a 5'-3' and 3'-5' helicase, respectively — they help unwind DNA and generate a junction between the double-stranded and single-stranded DNA around the transcription bubble. In addition to stabilizing TFIIH, XPG also has endonuclease activity; it cuts DNA damage on the 3' side while the XPF–ERCC1 heterodimeric protein cuts on the 5' side. The dual incision leads to the removal of a ssDNA with a single strand gap of 25~30 nucleotides. The small, excised, damage-containing DNA (sedDNA) oligonucleotides are initially released from the duplex in complex with TFIIH but then dissociate in an ATP-dependent manner and become bound to replication protein A (RPA). Inhibition of gap filling DNA synthesis and ligation results in an accumulation of RPA-bound sedDNAs in the cell.

Replication protein A (RPA) and XPA are the last two proteins associated with the main NER repair complex. These two proteins are present prior to TFIIH binding since they are involved with verifying DNA damage. They may also protect single-stranded DNA. After verification, the 5' side incision is made and DNA repair begins before the 3' side incision. This helps reduce exposed single stranded DNA during the repair process.

=== Repair and ligation ===
Replication factor C (RFC) loads the Proliferating Cell Nuclear Antigen (PCNA) onto the DNA strand. This allows DNA polymerases implicated in repair (δ, ε and/or κ) to copy the undamaged strand via translocation. DNA ligase I and Flap endonuclease 1 or the Ligase-III-XRCC1 complex seal the nicks to complete NER.

== In prokaryotes: Uvr proteins ==
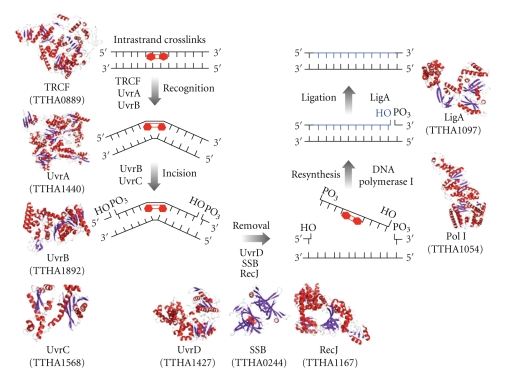
A schematic representation of models for the nucleotide excision repair pathway controlled by Uvr proteins.

The process of nucleotide excision repair is controlled in Escherichia coli by the UvrABC endonuclease enzyme complex, which consists of four Uvr proteins: UvrA, UvrB, UvrC, and DNA helicase II (sometimes also known as UvrD in this complex). First, a UvrA-UvrB complex scans the DNA, with the UvrA subunit recognizing distortions in the helix, caused for example by pyrimidine dimers. When the complex recognizes such a distortion, the UvrA subunit leaves and an UvrC protein comes in and binds to the UvrB monomer and, hence, forms a new UvrBC dimer. UvrB cleaves a phosphodiester bond 4 nucleotides downstream of the DNA damage, and the UvrC cleaves a phosphodiester bond 8 nucleotides upstream of the DNA damage and created 12 nucleotide excised segment. DNA helicase II (sometimes called UvrD) then comes in and removes the excised segment by actively breaking the hydrogen bonds between the complementary bases. The resultant gap is then filled in using DNA polymerase I and DNA ligase. The basic excision process is very similar in higher cells, but these cells usually involve many more proteins – E.coli is a simple example.

TC-NER also exists in bacteria, and is mediated by the TRCF (Mfd) protein. TRCF is an SF2 ATPase that uses ATP hydrolysis to translocate on dsDNA upstream of the transcription bubble and forward translocate RNA polymerase, thus initiating dissociation of the RNA Polymerase ternary elongation complex. TRCF also recruits the Uvr(A)BC nucleotide excision repair machinery by direct physical interaction with the UvrA subunit.

== Cancer ==
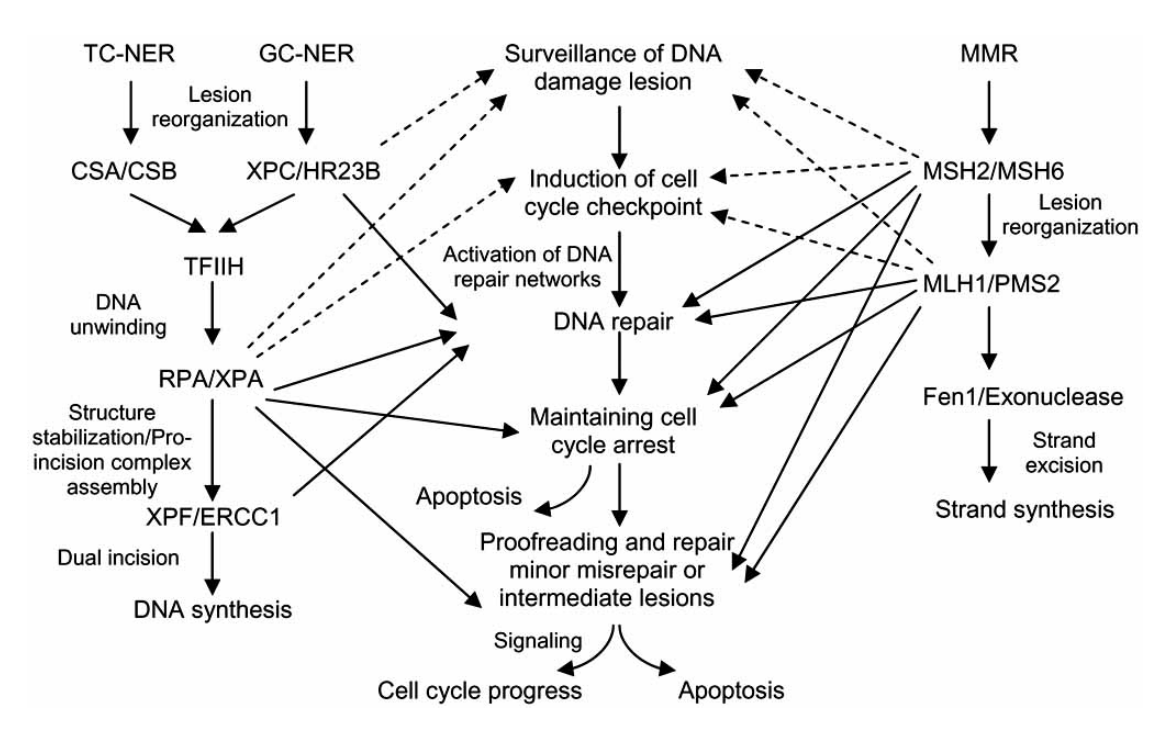
DNA excision pathways work in tandem to repair DNA damage. Unrepaired damage or malfunctioning proteins associated with excision repair could lead to unregulated cell growth and cancer.

Though historical studies have shown inconsistent results, genetic variation or mutation to nucleotide excision repair genes can impact cancer risk by affecting repair efficacy. Single-nucleotide polymorphisms (SNPs) and nonsynonymous coding SNPs (nsSNPs) are present at very low levels (>1%) in the human population. If located in NER genes or regulatory sequences, such mutations can negatively affect DNA repair capacity resulting in an increase likelihood of cancer development. While the functional impact of all polymorphisms has not been characterized, some polymorphisms in DNA repair genes or their regulatory sequences do induce phenotypical changes and are involved in cancer development. A study of lung cancer cases found modest association between NER specific SNP polymorphisms and lung cancer risk. The results indicate that some inherited polymorphic variations in NER genes may result in predisposition to lung cancer, and potentially other cancer states.

=== NER dysfunction result of DNA polymorphism ===
Two important genes in the NER pathway for which polymorphism has shown functional and phenotypic impact are the XPD and XPC genes. XPD, also known as ERCC2, serves to open DNA around the site of damage during NER, in addition to other transcriptional activities. Studies have shown that polymorphisms at Exon 10 (G>A)(Asp312Asn) and Exon 23 (A>T)(Lys751Gln) are linked with genetic predisposition to several cancer types. The XPC gene is responsible for a protein which recognizes DNA during the early portion of the NER pathway. This gene can have polymorphisms at Intron 9 and SNPs in Exon 15 which have been correlated with cancer risk as well. Research has shown that a biallelic poly (AT) insertion/deletion polymorphism in Intron 9 of XPC is associated with increased risk for skin, breast and prostate cancers, especially in North Indian populations.

=== Impact on cancer prognosis ===
The study of a hereditary cancer, xeroderma pigmentosum has helped identify several genes which encode proteins in the NER pathway, two of which are XPC and XPD. XP is caused by a homozygous deficiency in UV DNA damage repair (GG-NER) which increases the patients' risk of skin cancer by 1000-fold. In heterozygous patients, the risk of cancer is sporadic but can be predicted based on analytical assessment of polymorphisms in XP related DNA repair genes purified from lymphocytes. In a study relapse rates of high-risk stage II and III colorectal cancers, XPD (ERCC2) polymorphism 2251A>C was significantly correlated with early relapse after chemotherapeutic treatment. Studies have indicated that the effects of polymorphic NER genes is additive, with greater frequency of variants, greater cancer risk presents.

== Aging ==
In humans and mice, germline mutation in genes employed in NER cause features of premature aging. These genes and their corresponding proteins include ERCC1(ERCC1), ERCC2(XPD), ERCC3(XPB), ERCC4(XPF), ERCC5 (XPG), ERCC6(CSB) and ERCC8(CSA).

DNA repair-deficient ERCC1 mutant mice show features of accelerated aging, and have a limited lifespan. Accelerated aging in the mutant involves numerous organs.

Mutations in the ERCC2(XPD) gene can lead to various syndromes, either xeroderma pigmentosum (XP), trichothiodystrophy (TTD) or a combination of XP and TTD (XPTTD), or a combination of XP and Cockayne syndrome (XPCS). TTD and CS both display features of premature aging. These features may include sensorineural deafness, retinal degeneration, white matter hypomethylation, central nervous system calcification, reduced stature, and cachexia (loss of subcutaneous fat tissue). XPCS and TTD fibroblasts from ERCC2(XPD) mutant human and mouse show evidence of defective repair of oxidative DNA damages that may underlie the segmental progeroid (premature aging) symptoms (see DNA damage theory of aging).

Mutations in the ERCC3(XPB) gene can lead, in humans, to xeroderma pigmentosum (XP) or XP combined with Cockayne syndrome (XPCS).

Deficiency of ERCC4(XPF) in humans results in a variety of conditions including accelerated aging.

In humans, mutational defects in the ERCC5(XPG) gene can cause either the cancer-prone condition xeroderma pigmentosum (XP) alone, or in combination with the severe neurodevelopmental disorder Cockayne syndrome (CS) or the infantile lethal cerebro-oculo-facio-skeletal syndrome. An ERCC5(XPG) mutant mouse model presents features of premature aging including cachexia and osteoporosis with pronounced degenerative phenotypes in both liver and brain. These mutant mice develop a multi-system premature aging degenerative phenotype that appears to strengthen the link between DNA damage and aging.(see DNA damage theory of aging).

Cockayne syndrome (CS) arises from germline mutations in either of two genes ERCC8(CSA) or ERCC6(CSB). ERCC8(CSA) mutations generally give rise to a more moderate form of CS than ERCC6(CSB) mutations. Mutations in the CSA gene account for about 20% of CS cases. Individuals with CSA and CSB are characterised by severe postnatal growth and intellectual disability and accelerated aging leading to premature death at the age of 12 to 16 years.

=== Decline in NER with aging ===
As reviewed by Gorbunova et al., studies of NER in different cells and tissues from young and old individuals frequently have shown a decrease in NER capacity with increasing age. This decline may be due to reduced constitutive levels of proteins employed in the NER pathway.

== NER associated genes ==
Human Gene (Protein)	Mouse Ortholog	Yeast Ortholog	Subpathway	Function in NER	GeneCards Entry
CCNH (Cyclin H)	Ccnh	CCL1	Both	CDK Activator Kinase (CAK) subunit	CCNH
CDK7 (Cyclin Dependent Kinase (CDK) 7))	Cdk7	KIN28	Both	CAK subunit	CDK7
CETN2 (Centrin-2)	Cetn2	Unknown	GGR	Damage recognition; forms complex with XPC	CETN2
DDB1 (DDB1)	Ddb1	Unknown	GGR	Damage recognition; forms complex with DDB2	DDB1
DDB2 (DDB2)	Ddb2/Xpe	Unknown	GGR	Damage recognition; recruits XPC	DDB2
ERCC1 (ERCC1)	Ercc1	RAD10	Both	Involved in incision on 3' side of damage; forms complex with XPF	ERCC1
ERCC2 (XPD)	Ercc2	RAD3	Both	ATPase and helicase activity; transcription factor II H (TFIIH) subunit	ERCC2
ERCC3 (XPB)	Ercc3	RAD25	Both	ATPase and helicase activity; transcription factor II H (TFIIH) subunit	ERCC3
ERCC4 (XPF)	Ercc4	RAD1	Both	Involved in incision on 3' side of damage; structure specific endonuclease	ERCC4
ERCC5 (XPG)	Ercc5	RAD2	Both	Involved in incision on 5' side of damage; stabilizes TFIIH; structure specific endonuclease	ERCC5
ERCC6 (CSB)	Ercc6	RAD26	TC-NER	Transcription elongation factor; involved in transcription coupling and chromatin remodelling	ERCC6
ERCC8 (CSA)	Ercc8	RAD28	TC-NER	Ubiquitin ligase complex; interacts with CSB and p44 of TFIIH	ERCC8
LIG1 (DNA Ligase I)	Lig1	CDC9	Both	Final ligation	LIG1
MNAT1 (MNAT1)	Mnat1	TFB3	Both	Stabilizes CAK complex	MNAT1
MMS19 (MMS19)	Mms19	MET18	Both	Interacts with XPD and XPB subunits of TFIIH helicases	MMS19
RAD23A (RAD23A)	Rad23a	RAD23	GGR	Damage recognition; forms complex with XPC	RAD23A
RAD23B (RAD23B)	Rad23b	RAD23	GGR	Damage recognition, forms complex with XPC	RAD23B
RPA1 (RPA1)	Rpa1	RFA1	Both	Subunit of RFA complex	RPA1
RPA2 (RPA2)	Rpa2	RFA2	Both	Subunit of RFA complex	RPA2
TFIIH (Transcription factor II H)	Gtf2h1-3	Tfb1 Ssl1 Tfb4	Both	Involved in incision, forms complex around lesion	GTF2H1 GTF2H2 GTF2H3
XAB2 (XAB2)	Xab2	SYF1	TC-NER	Damage recognition; interacts with XPA, CSA, and CSB	XAB2
XPA (XPA)	Xpa	RAD14	Both	Damage recognition	XPA
XPC (XPC)	Xpc	RAD4	GGR	Damage recognition	XPC

== See also ==
- Base excision repair (BER)
- Mismatch repair (MMR)
