= XPC (gene) =

Protein-coding gene in the species Homo sapiens

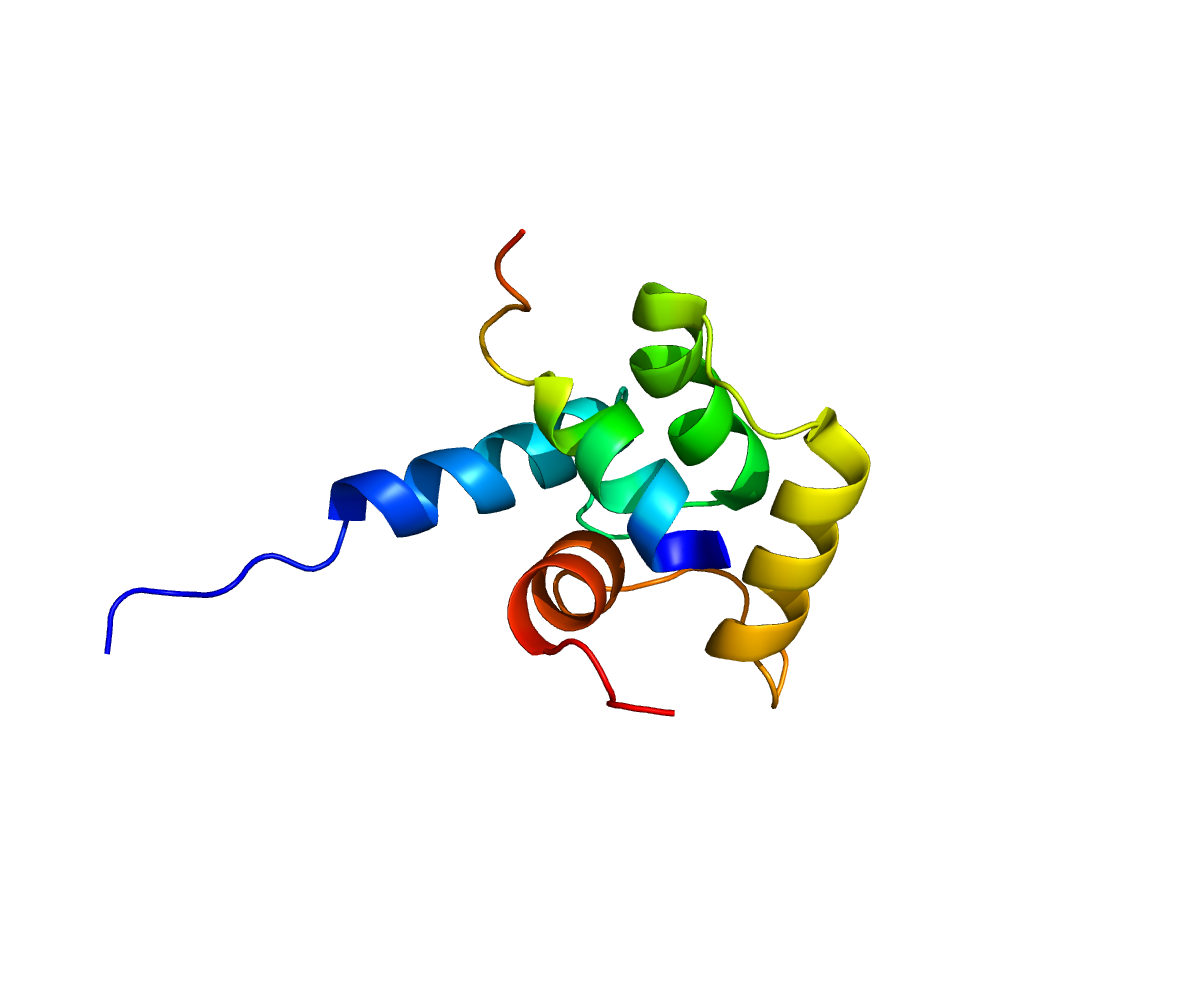

Identifiers
- Aliases: XPC, RAD4, XP3, XPCC, p125, xeroderma pigmentosum, complementation group C, XPC complex subunit, DNA damage recognition and repair factor
- External IDs: OMIM: 613208; MGI: 103557; GeneCards: XPC
Available structures
PDB	Ortholog search: PDBe RCSB
PDB	List of PDB id codes 2A4J, 2GGM, 2OBH, 2RVB

Gene location (Mouse)
Chr.	Chromosome 6 (mouse)
Band	6|6 D1	Start	91,466,287 bp
Band	6|6 D1	End	91,492,870 bp
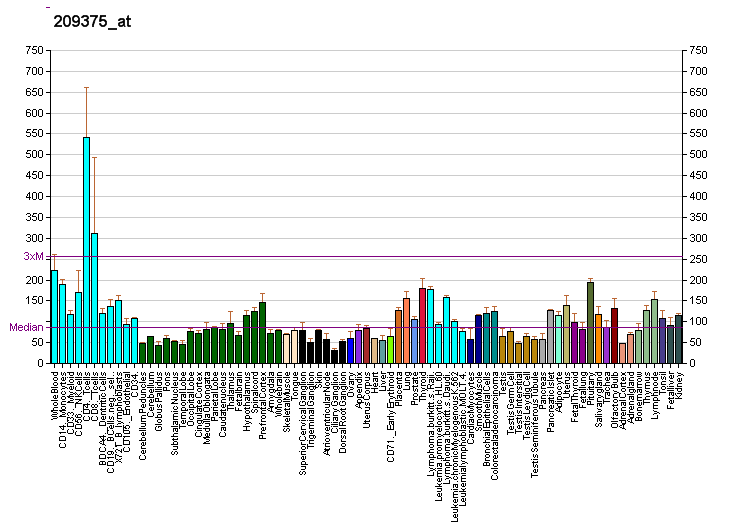
RNA expression pattern
Bgee	Human / Mouse (ortholog); n/a / Top expressed in: granulocyte; Paneth cell; substantia nigra; right kidney; proximal tubule; conjunctival fornix; vestibular membrane of cochlear duct; external carotid artery; condyle; right lung lobe
BioGPS	More reference expression data
Gene ontology
Molecular function	DNA binding; heteroduplex DNA loop binding; bubble DNA binding; single-stranded DNA binding; damaged DNA binding; protein binding; protein-containing complex binding
Cellular component	cytoplasm; plasma membrane; nucleoplasm; XPC complex; nucleolus; nucleotide-excision repair factor 2 complex; nucleus; mitochondrion; intracellular membrane-bounded organelle; nucleotide-excision repair complex
Biological process	nucleotide-excision repair; regulation of mitotic cell cycle phase transition; nucleotide-excision repair, DNA damage recognition; mitotic intra-S DNA damage checkpoint signaling; cellular response to DNA damage stimulus; global genome nucleotide-excision repair; response to auditory stimulus; DNA mismatch repair; response to UV-B; UV-damage excision repair; DNA repair; nucleotide-excision repair, preincision complex assembly; nucleotide-excision repair, DNA duplex unwinding
Sources:Amigo / QuickGO
Orthologs
Databases	NCBI: entry; OMA: entry
Species	Human	Mouse
Entrez	7508	22591
Ensembl	ENSG00000154767	ENSMUSG00000030094
UniProt	Q01831	P51612
RefSeq (mRNA)	NM_001145769; NM_004628	NM_009531
RefSeq (protein)	NP_004619; NP_001341655; NP_001341656; NP_001341658; NP_001341659	NP_033557
Location (UCSC)	n/a	Chr 6: 91.47 – 91.49 Mb
PubMed search
- Wikidata
View/Edit Human	View/Edit Mouse

Xeroderma pigmentosum, complementation group C, also known as XPC, is a protein which in humans is encoded by the XPC gene. XPC is involved in the recognition of bulky DNA adducts in nucleotide excision repair. It is located on chromosome 3.

== Function ==
This gene encodes a component of the nucleotide excision repair (NER) pathway. There are multiple components involved in the NER pathway, including Xeroderma pigmentosum (XP) A-G and V, Cockayne syndrome (CS) A and B, and trichothiodystrophy (TTD) group A, etc. This component, XPC, plays an important role in the early steps of global genome NER, especially in damage recognition, open complex formation, and repair protein complex formation.

The complex of XPC-RAD23B is the initial damage recognition factor in global genomic nucleotide excision repair (GG-NER). XPC-RAD23B recognizes a wide variety of lesions that thermodynamically destabilize DNA duplexes, including UV-induced photoproducts (cyclopyrimidine dimers and 6-4 photoproducts ), adducts formed by environmental mutagens such as benzo[a]pyrene or various aromatic amines, certain oxidative endogenous lesions such as cyclopurines and adducts formed by cancer chemotherapeutic drugs such as cisplatin. The presence of XPC-RAD23B is required for assembly of the other core NER factors and progression through the NER pathway both in vitro and in vivo. Although most studies have been performed with XPC-RAD23B, it is part of a trimeric complex with centrin-2, a calcium-binding protein of the calmodulin family.

== Clinical significance ==
Mutations in this gene or some other NER components result in Xeroderma pigmentosum, a rare autosomal recessive disorder characterized by increased sensitivity to sunlight with the development of carcinomas at an early age.

=== Cancer ===
DNA damage appears to be the primary underlying cause of cancer, and deficiencies in DNA repair genes likely underlie many forms of cancer. If DNA repair is deficient, DNA damage tends to accumulate. Such excess DNA damage may increase mutations due to error-prone translesion synthesis. Excess DNA damage may also increase epigenetic alterations due to errors during DNA repair. Such mutations and epigenetic alterations may give rise to cancer.

Reductions in expression of DNA repair genes (usually caused by epigenetic alterations such as promoter hypermethylation) are very common in cancers, and are ordinarily much more frequent than mutational defects in DNA repair genes in cancers. The table below shows that XPC expression was frequently epigenetically reduced in bladder cancer and also in non-small cell lung cancer, and also shows that XPC was more frequently reduced in the more advanced stages of these cancers.

Frequency of reduced expression of XPC in cancers, with stages of cancers indicated separately
Cancer	Frequency	Ref.
Bladder cancer	50%	
Papillary urothelial neoplasm of low malignant potential	35%	
Low grade papillary bladder cancer	42%	
High grade papillary bladder cancer	65%	
Non-small cell lung cancer (NSCLC)	70%	
NSCLC Stage I	62%	
NSCLC Stages II-III	77%	

While epigenetic hypermethylation of the promoter region of the XPC gene was shown to be associated with low expression of XPC, another mode of epigenetic repression of XPC may also occur by over-expression of the microRNA miR-890.

== Interactions ==
XPC (gene) has been shown to interact with ABCA1, CETN2 and XPB.
