= Stephen C. West =

British biochemist and molecular biologist

Stephen West
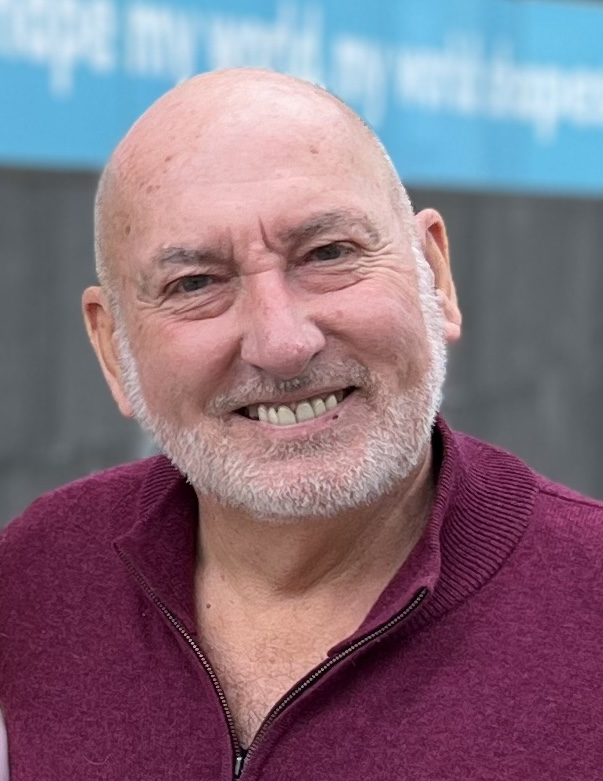
- Stephen West
- Born: 11 April 1952 (age 74); Hessle, England, United Kingdom
- Awards: Royal Medal (2022); Louis-Jeantet Prize for Medicine (2007); The Genetics Society Medal (2012); Cancer Research UK Lifetime Achievement Prize (2018)
- Scientific career
- Fields: DNA recombination and repair
- Workplaces: Francis Crick Institute, Yale University, Newcastle University

Stephen Craig West (born 11 April 1952) is a British biochemist and molecular biologist specialising in research on DNA recombination and repair. West was trained as a biochemist and molecular biologist and specialises on research into chromosome instability and links to cancer. West obtained his BSc in 1974, and his PhD in 1977, both from Newcastle University. He is currently a Principal Group Leader at the Francis Crick Institute in London. He is an honorary Professor at University College London, and at Imperial College London. In recognition of his work he was awarded the Louis-Jeantet Prize for Medicine in 2007, is a fellow of the Royal Society, the Academy of Medical Sciences, an International Member of the National Academy of Sciences, and an International Honorary Member of the American Academy of Arts and Sciences. He received the 2022 Royal Medal, a gift from Queen Elizabeth II, for 'discovering and determining the functions of key enzymes that are essential for DNA recombination, repair and the maintenance of genomes'.

== Early life and education ==
Stephen West was born on 11 April 1952 in Hessle, Yorkshire, to Joseph Clair West, a fishbuyer, and Louise West, a factory worker. He attended Hessle High School and then went to Newcastle University where he studied biochemistry. He graduated with a BSc in 1974, and stayed in Newcastle to complete his PhD in 1977.

== Career ==
During his PhD work, he became interested in how cells recombine their DNA and use recombination for DNA repair. In 1977, he identified 'protein X' as the elusive RecA protein, which is essential for recombination and repair in bacteria. After finishing his PhD, he moved to the United States to join the group led by Paul Howard-Flanders, one of the early pioneers in the field of DNA repair. In 1985, West moved back to the United Kingdom and established his own group at the Imperial Cancer Research Fund's laboratories in South Mimms in Hertfordshire, which subsequently became known as Cancer Research UK. In 2016, his laboratory moved to the Francis Crick Institute in London.

== Research ==
=== Highlights of research ===
His PhD work was instrumental in the identification of a DNA damage inducible protein, known as Protein X, as RecA protein, which plays a key role in DNA recombination and repair. He then moved to Yale University to work with Paul Howard-Flanders, where he purified and characterised RecA protein. There, he discovered aspects relating to the way that cells mediate the DNA-DNA interactions and strand exchanges required for the recombinational repair of DNA damage.

After moving to the UK in 1985, West continued his work in bacterial systems, and set about trying to identify cellular proteins capable of resolving recombination intermediates. He identified RuvC as the first cellular enzyme that resolves recombination intermediates and characterised how this nuclease cuts Holliday junctions. He was also the first to show that RuvA and RuvB are motor proteins that mediate Holliday junction branch migration. His biochemical studies were compounded by genetic work from the laboratory of Robert Lloyd (University of Nottingham).

West’s laboratory then moved into eukaryotic systems, where he discovered eukaryotic Holliday junction resolvases (yeast Yen1 and human GEN1). The identification of GEN1 allowed a genetic analysis of the pathways by which recombination intermediates are processed. Present understanding indicates that there are three distinct pathways of Holliday junction processing in human cells involving BLM-topoIIIα-RMI1-RMI2 (BTR), SLX1-SLX4-MUS81-EME1-ERCC1-XPF (SMX) and GEN1. His laboratory discovered that the Holliday junction resolvase activities of MUS81 and GEN1 are regulated so that they act late in the cell cycle to ensure chromosome segregation.

In addition to the discovery of cellular Holliday junction resolvases, West was the first to purify human RAD51 protein (the eukaryotic ortholog of RecA), and to show that it promotes homologous pairing and strand exchange reactions similar to those mediated by RecA. In addition, he purified and then visualised the BRCA2 breast cancer tumour suppressor, showing that it acts as a molecular chaperone for the association RAD51 with DNA. His laboratory also discovered that Aprataxin, which is defective in a progressive neurological disorder known as Oculomotor apraxia, is a 5'-deadenylase that removes AMP from 5'-termini following abortive DNA ligation.

Recently his laboratory determined the high resolution structure of the two RAD51 paralog complexes (made up of RAD51B, RAD51C, RAD51D, XRCC2 and XRCC3) using cryo-electron microscopy and, in work considered to be a tour-de-force in the field, he defined their functions in DNA repair and tumour avoidance. He also used cryo-EM and biochemistry to determine the mechanism of single strand DNA annealing by the RAD52 protein.

Due to the role that DNA repair plays in the maintenance of genome stability and cancer avoidance, West’s work contributes to the understanding the molecular basis of human disease. In particular his laboratory discovered that loss of a nucleotide pool scavenger known as DNPH1 sensitizes cancer cells to the PARP inhibitor olaparib, a drug that is currently in clinical use for the treatment of breast, ovarian and prostate cancers caused by inheritable mutations in BRCA1 or BRCA2. New work from his laboratory indicates that PARP inhibitors induce centromeric DNA rearrangements, and this may throw new light on why prolonged PARPi treatment leads to haematologic toxicities, including myelosuppression, increased risk of myelodysplastic syndrome (MDS) and acute myeloid leukaemia (AML).

=== Other professional activities ===
West has been on the editorial boards of ELife (2014–2016), The EMBO Journal (1996–2020) and EMBO Reports (2000–2022). He is on the editorial board of DNA Repair. From 2023-2026 he was a Member of Council of the Royal Society. He currently serves as Chair of the International Advisory Board of the Chinese Institutes of Medical Research, Beijing.

== Honours and awards ==
- 1995: Elected as Fellow of the Royal Society
- 2000: Elected as Fellow of the Academy of Medical Sciences
- 2002: Leeuwenhoek Medal of the Royal Society
- 2007: Louis-Jeantet Prize for Medicine (2007)
- 2008: Novartis Medal
- 2010: GlaxoSmithKline Prize of the Royal Society
- 2012: The Genetics Society Medal
- 2016: Elected as an International Member of the National Academy of Sciences (USA)
- 2018: Lifetime Achievement in Cancer Research Prize awarded by Cancer Research UK
- 2021: Elected as International Honorary Member of the American Academy of Arts and Sciences.
- 2022: The Royal Medal (a gift of Queen Elizabeth II)

== Publications ==
West has published over 270 papers which have been cited more than 45,000 times. He has a H-index of 122.
