= Double-strand break repair model =

Model of DNA repair in biology

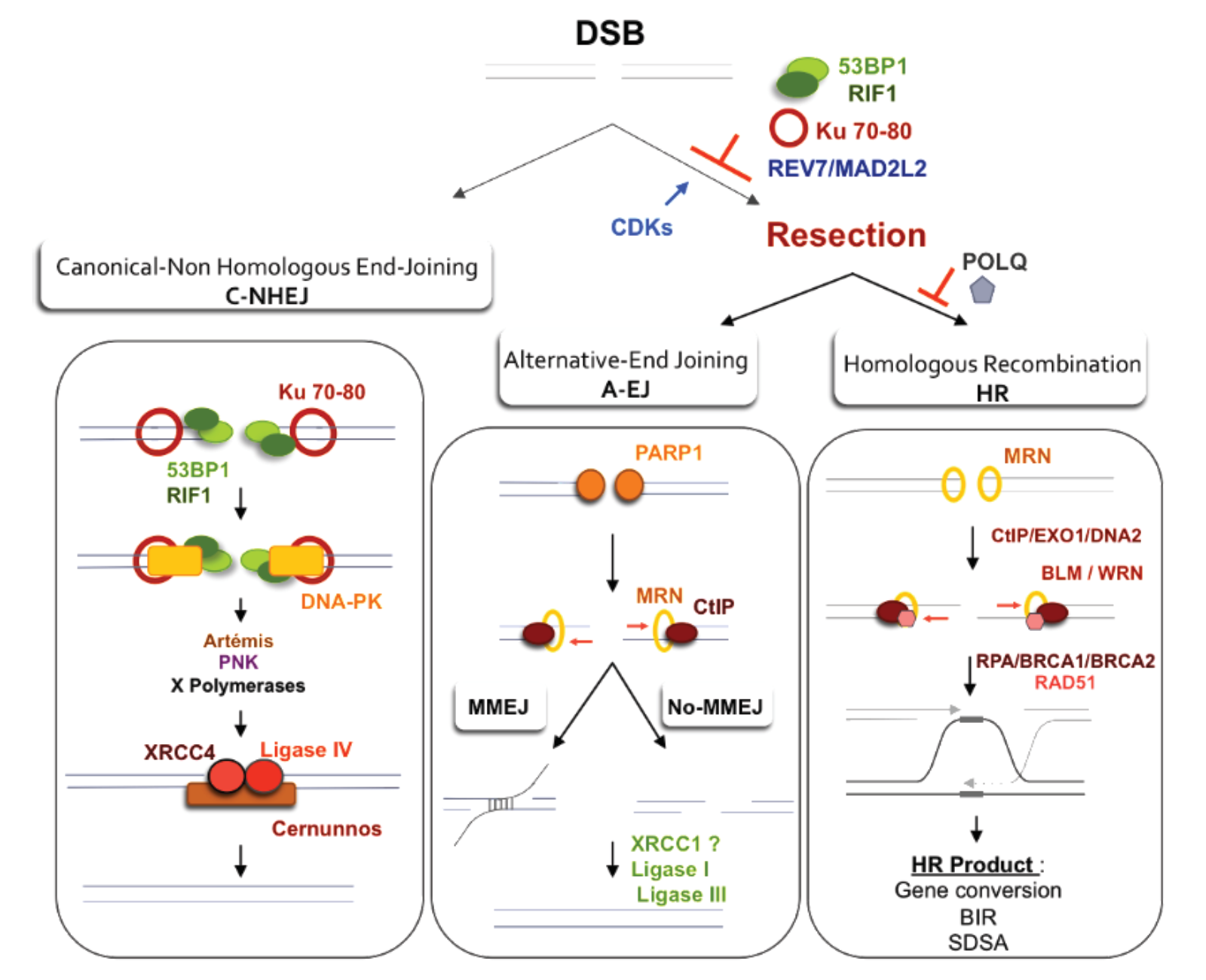
Various pathways for double-strand break repair. NHEJ in this article refers to cNHEJ. MMEJ in this article refers to a-EJ.

A double-strand break repair model refers to the various models of pathways that cells undertake to repair double-strand breaks (DSB). DSB repair is an important cellular process, as the accumulation of unrepaired DSB could lead to chromosomal rearrangements, tumorigenesis or even cell death. In human cells, there are two main DSB repair mechanisms: Homologous recombination (HR) and non-homologous end joining (NHEJ). HR can be seen as a more accurate site specific form of repair. It requires much more larger and intricate protein complexes. These complexes that involve proteins such as RAD51 (searches for homology and mediates strand invasion) and BRCA2 (the well studied RAD51 localizer) are critical in support of DNA replication and the recovery of stalled or broken replication forks. NHEJ modifies and ligates the damaged ends regardless of homology. In terms of DSB repair pathway choice, most mammalian cells appear to favor NHEJ rather than HR. This is because the employment of HR may lead to gene deletion or amplification in cells which contains repetitive sequences. In terms of repair models in the cell cycle, HR is only possible during the S and G2 phases, while NHEJ can occur throughout whole process. These repair pathways are all regulated by the overarching DNA damage response mechanism. Besides HR and NHEJ, there are also other repair models which exists in cells. Some are categorized under HR, such as synthesis-dependent strand annealing, break-induced replication, and single-strand annealing; while others are an entirely alternate repair model, namely, the pathway microhomology-mediated end joining (MMEJ).

== Causes ==
DSB can occur naturally by exogenous sources or endogenous sources. Exoogenously due to the presence of reactive species generated by metabolism, as well as replication stress and various external factors such as ionizing radiation or chemotherapeutic drugs. Endogenous breaks are due to DNA replication, transcription, as well as normal cellular processes.

The exogenous source of ionization causing DSB's can be a result of radiation directly hitting a sequence of DNA or localized radiation by neighboring molecules, resulting in a chain reaction of molecular breaks. Each lesion or break is completely dependent on the type of radiation it is exposed to. Examples such as proton particles and X rays effect strands differently, while the former directly disrupts the bonds created by the negatively charged backbone of DNA, the ladder is effected by indirect exposure.

Not all DSB damage results in catastrophic cell cycling (i.e. endogenous reactions). Regularly DNA goes through oxidative damage which quickly arise and are then quickly resolved and repaired. These are referred to as programmed DSB's. This controlled damage and repair promotes diversity during the cell cycle and subsequent division. Programmed DSB's have been proven to be imperative for mammalian cell development. The breaks caused be a RAG protein complex are integral for sexual reproduction. The breaks induce a crossover formation for faithful segregation of homologous chromosomes.

In mammalian cells, there are numerous cellular processes that induce DSB. Firstly, DNA topological strain from topoisomerase during normal cell growth can cause the majority a cell's DSB. Secondly, cellular processes such as meiosis and the maturation of antibodies can cause nuclease-induced DSB. Thirdly, the cleavage of different DNA structures such as reversed or blocked DNA replication forks, R-loops and DNA interstrand crosslinks can also cause DSB.

== Different models ==
=== Homologous recombination ===
Homologous recombination involves the exchange of DNA materials between homologous chromosomes. There are multiple pathways of HR to repair DSBs, which includes double-strand break repair (DSBR), synthesis-dependent strand annealing (SDSA), break-induced replication (BIR), and single-strand annealing (SSA).

The basis of homologous recombination stems from the central reaction of homology search and DNA strand invasion by specific protein and single strand DNA presynaptic filaments. Which is then followed by synapsis; that is the action of strand invasion and the formation of a displacement loop (D-loop) which is formed during strand invasion between the invading 3' overhang strand and the homologous chromosome. After DNA is newly synthesized the invading strand is disengaged and annealed during post-synapse leading to genetic crossover.

The regulation of HR in mammalian cells involves key HR proteins (or mediator proteins) such as BRCA1 and BRCA2. It has well been supported that BRCA1 plays a role in end resection. Its role has been proven to be associated with different mechanisms such as antagonizing, promoting, and inhibiting certain protein/ssDNA complexes. BRCA2, a tumor suppressor gene that is the center of a wide variety of research; has experimentally been seen to act in concert with BRCA1-PALB2 to form a complex and load RAD51 onto ssDNA that is coated with RPA. In vivo, BRCA2 mutations lead to predisposed ovarian or breast cancer so it is apparent that is function is integral for dsDNA break repair.

==== Double-strand break repair ====
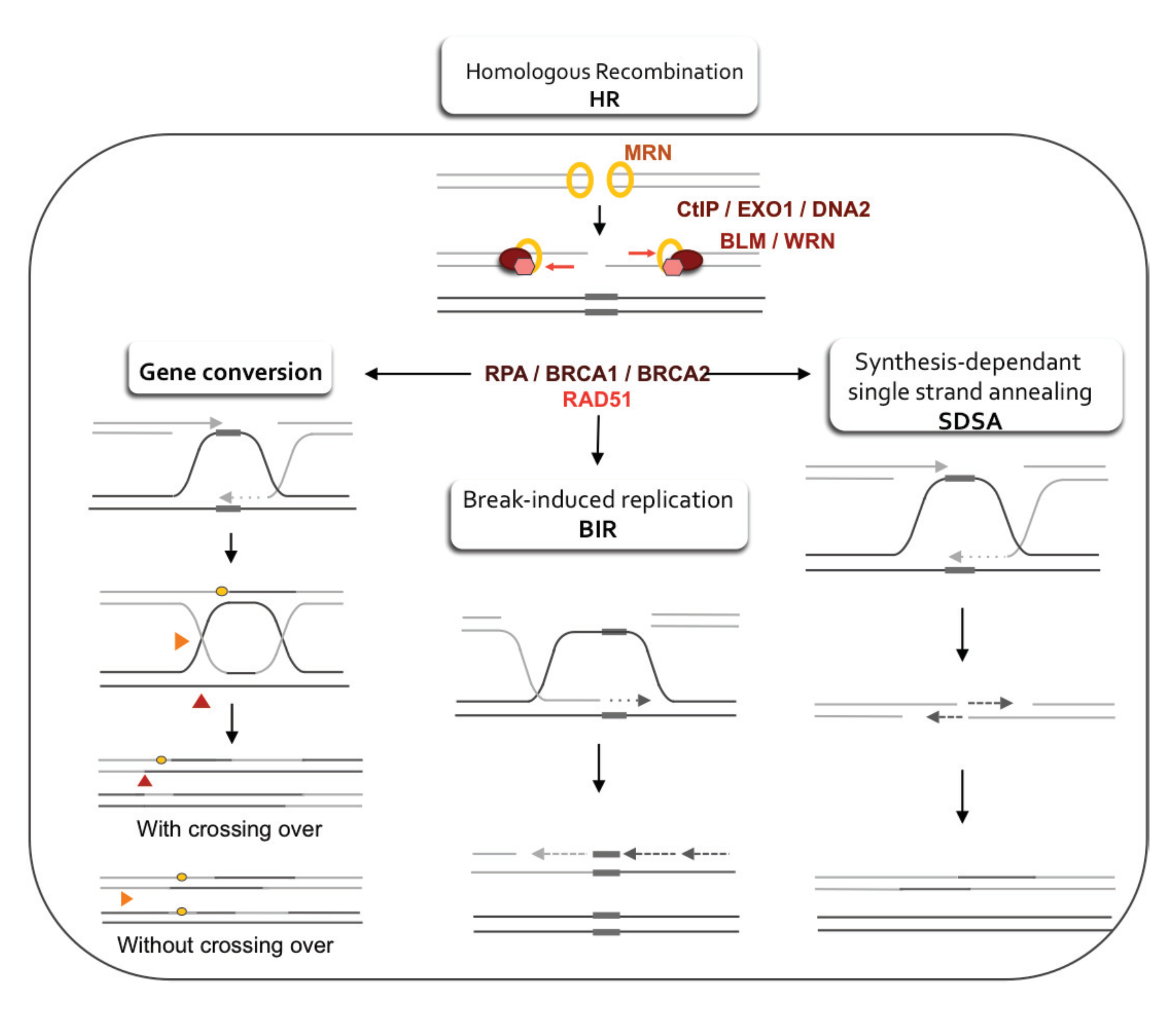
Three possible sub-pathways for a double-strand break to repair via homologous recombination: Gene conversion, BIR and SDSA. The gene conversion is referring to the double-strand break repair model. The other sub-pathway is the synthesis-dependent strain annealing. SSA is the fourth sub-pathway and it is not shown in this diagram.

HR repairs DSB by copying intact and homologous DNA molecules. The blunt ends of the DSB are processed into ssDNA with 3' extensions, which allows RAD51 recombinase (eukaryotic homologue of prokaryotic RecA) to bind to it to form a nucleoprotein filament. The function of the filament is to locate the template DNA and form a joint heteroduplex molecule. Other proteins such as RP-A protein and RAD52 also coordinate in the heteroduplex formation, the RP-A protein has to be removed for the RAD51 to form the filament, whereas the RAD52 is a key HR mediator. Afterwards, the 3' ssDNA invades the template DNA, and displaces a DNA strand to form a D-loop. DNA polymerase and other accessory factors follows by replacing the missing DNA via DNA synthesis. Ligase then attaches the DNA strand break, resulting in the formation of 2 Holliday junctions. The recombined DNA strands then undergoes resolution by cleavage. The orientation of the cleavage determines whether the resolution results in either cross-over or noncross-over products. Lastly, the strands finally separate and revert to its original form.

, the main pathway for resolution relies on the BTR (BLM helicase-TopoisomeraseIIIα-RMI1-RM2) complex, where it induces the resolution of the 2 Holliday junctions, but this pathway favors the noncross-over cleavage.

==== Synthesis-dependent strand annealing ====
Synthesis-dependent strain annealing is the most preferred repair mechanism in somatic cells. The pathway of SDSA is similar to DSBR until just after the D-loop formation. Instead of forming Holliday junctions after DNA synthesis, the nascent strand dissociates via RETL1 helicase and anneals back to the other end of the resected strand. This explains why SDSA results in a non-crossover pathway. The remaining gap is filled in and the nick is attached by the ligase.

==== Break-induced replication ====
Although there is little research in regards of break-induced replication, it is known through multiple experiments utilizing yeast as a model that it is a one-ended recombination mechanism, where only of the one ends of a DSB will be involved in strand invasion. BIR however, has been proven to work during replication restart and repair of eroded telomeres as well as unexpectedly RAD51's independence from the BIR process. This means that unlike DSBR, BIR does not link back to the second DSB end after the strand invasion and replication. Seeing as HR is a strictly regulated process and BIR is another possible stage of regulation, it will drive further interest into the mechanism in the near future.

==== Single-strand annealing ====
Single-strand annealing involves homologous/repeated sequences flanking a DSB. The process starts with the key end resection factor CtlP, which mediates the end resection of DSBs, resulting in the formation of a 3' ssDNA extension. Meditated by RAD52, the flanking homologous sequences are annealed, and forms a synapse intermediate. Then, the nonhomologous 3' extension is removed by the ERCC1-XPF complex through endonucleolytic cleavage, with RAD52 increasing the efficiency of the ERCC1-XPF complex activity. It is only after the removal of 3' ssDNA, where the polymerase will fill the missing gaps and the ligase to ligate the strands. Since SSA results in the deletion of repetitive sequences, this could potentially lead to error-prone repair.

Single-strand annealing differs from SDSA and DSBR in numerous ways. For instance, the 3' extension after the end resection in SSA anneals to the repeated/homologous sequences of the other end, whereas in other pathways the strand invasion to another homologous DNA template. Moreover, SSA does not require RAD51, because it does not involve strand invasion, but rather the annealing of homologous sequences.

=== Non-homologous end joining ===
Non-homologous end joining (NHEJ) is one of the major pathways in DSB repair besides HR. The basic concept of NHEJ involves three steps. First, the ends of a DSB is captured by a group of enzymes. The enzymes then form a bridge which connects the DSB ends together, and is lastly followed by religation of the DNA strands. To initiate whole process, the Ku70/80 protein complex binds to the damaged ends of the DSB strands. This forms a preliminary scaffold which allows the recruitment of various NHEJ factors, such as the DNA-dependent protein kinase catalytic subunit (DNA-PKcs), DNA Ligase IV and X-ray cross complementing protein 4 (XRCC4) to form a bridge and bring both ends of the damaged DNA strands together. This is then followed by the processing of any non-ligatable DNA termini by a group of proteins including Artemis, PNKP, APLF and Ku, before the XRCC4 and DNA Ligase IV ligate the bridged DNA.

=== Microhomology-mediated end joining ===
Microhomology-mediated end joining (MMEJ), also known as alt-non-homologous end joining, is another pathway to repair DSBs. The process of MMEJ can be summarized in five steps: the 5' to 3' cutting of DNA ends, annealing of microhomology, removing heterologous flaps, and ligation and synthesis of gap filling DNA. It was found that the selection between MMEJ and NHEJ is mainly dependent on Ku levels and the concurrent cell cycle.

== The regulation of double-strand break repair pathways ==
=== DNA damage response ===
DNA damage response (DDR) is the overarching mechanism which mediates the cell's detection and response to DNA damage. This includes the process of detecting DSB within the cell, and the subsequent triggering and regulation of DSB repair pathways. Upstream detections of DNA damage via DDR will lead to the activation of downstream responses such as senescence, cell apoptosis, halting transcription and activating DNA repair mechanisms. Proteins such as the proteins ATM, ATR and DNA-dependent protein kinase (DNA-PK) are vital for the process of detection of DSB in DDR, and these proteins are recruited to the DSB site in the DNA. In particular, ATM has been identified as the protein kinase in charge of the global meditation of cellular responses to DSB, which includes various DSB repair pathways. Following the recruitment of the aforementioned proteins to DNA damage sites, they will in turn trigger cellular responses and repair pathways to mitigate and repair the damage caused. In short, these vital upstream proteins and downstream repair pathways altogether forms the DDR, which plays a vital role in DSB repair pathways regulation.

=== Fanconi anemia complex in one DNA damage response pathway ===
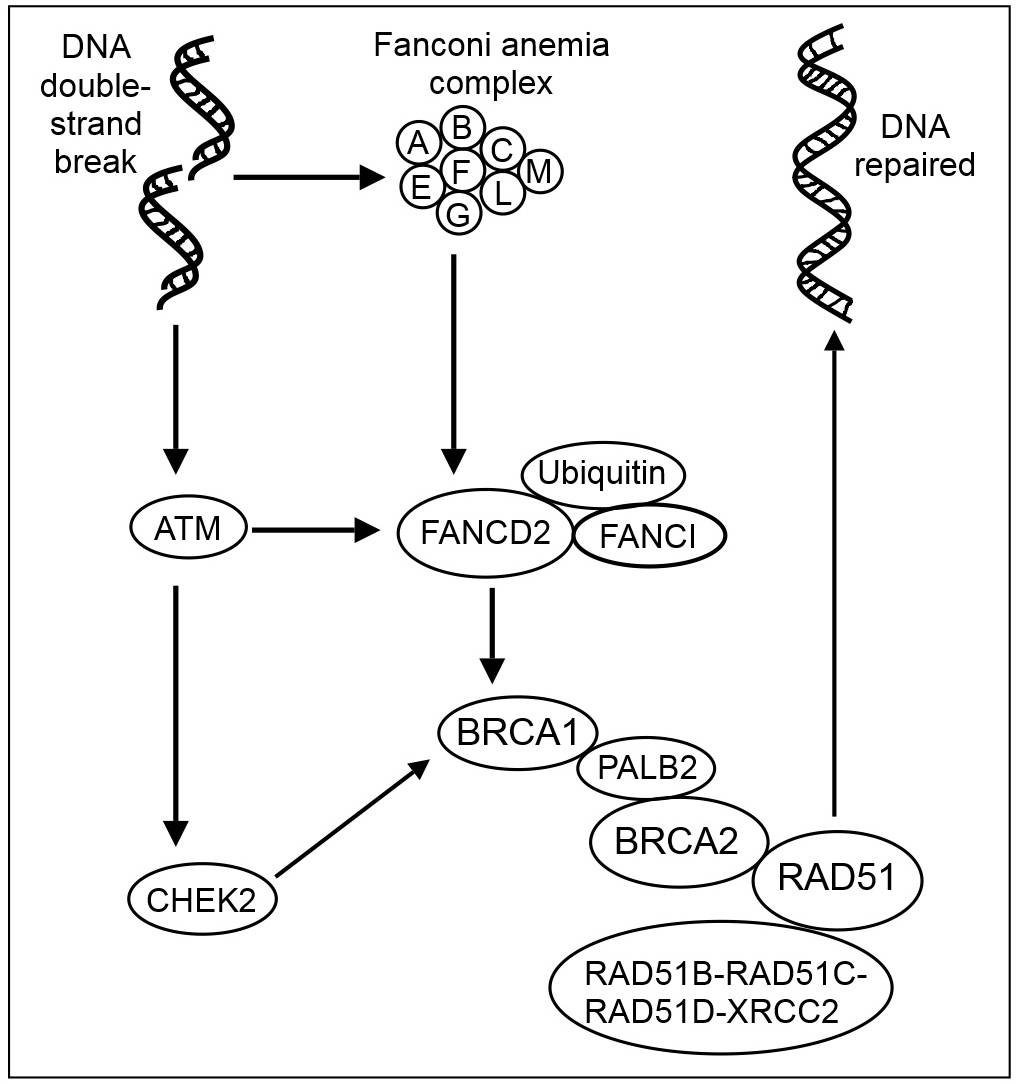

The image in this section illustrates molecular steps in a DNA damage response pathway in which a Fanconi anemia complex is activated during repair of a double-strand break. ATM (ATM) is also a protein kinase that is recruited and activated by DNA double-strand breaks. DNA double-strand damages activate the Fanconi anemia core complex (FANCA/B/C/E/F/G/L/M). The FA core complex monoubiquitinates the downstream targets FANCD2 and FANCI. ATM activates (phosphorylates) CHEK2 and FANCD2 CHEK2 phosphorylates BRCA1. Ubiquinated FANCD2 complexes with BRCA1 and RAD51. The PALB2 protein acts as a hub, bringing together BRCA1, BRCA2 and RAD51 at the site of a DNA double-strand break, and also binds to RAD51C, a member of the RAD51 paralog complex RAD51B-RAD51C-RAD51D-XRCC2 (BCDX2). The BCDX2 complex is responsible for RAD51 recruitment or stabilization at damage sites. RAD51 plays a major role in homologous recombinational repair of DNA during double strand break repair. In this process, an ATP dependent DNA strand exchange takes place in which a template strand invades base-paired strands of homologous DNA molecules. RAD51 is involved in the search for homology and strand pairing stages of the process.

=== Double-strand break repair pathway choice ===
As cells have developed various DSB repair models, it is said that specific pathways are favoured for their ability to repair DSB depending on the cellular context. These conditions include the type of DSB involved, the species of cells involved, and the stage of the cell cycle.

==== In various types of DSB ====
Cells have evolved a multitude of DSB repair pathways in response to the various types of DSB. Hence, various pathways are favoured in different situations. For instance, frank DSB, which are DSB induced by substances like as ionizing radiation, and nucleases, can be repaired by both HR and NHEJ. On the other hand, DSB due to replication fork collapse mainly favours HR.

==== In higher eukaryotes and yeast cells ====
It is said that the favoured pathway in a particular situations is also largely dependent on the species of the cell, the cell type, and cell cycle phases; and are all modulated and triggered by different upstream regulatory proteins. As compared to higher eukaryotes, yeast cells have adopted HR as the main repair pathway for DSB. Imprecise NHEJ, the primary pathway for NHEJ to repair "dirty" ends due to IR, was found to be inefficient at repairing DSB in yeast cells. It was hypothesized that this inefficiency as compared to mammalian cells is due to the lack of three vital NHEJ proteins, including DNA-PKcs, BRCA1, and Artemis. Contrary to yests, higher eukaryotes has a much higher frequency and efficiency at adopting NHEJ pathways. Research hypothesize that this is due to the higher eukaryote's larger genome size, as it means that more NHEJ related proteins are encoded for NHEJ repair pathways; and a larger genome implies a challenging obstacle to find a homologous template for HR.

==== In cell cycle ====
HR and NHEJ pathways are favoured in various phases of cell cycles for a multitude of factors. As S and G2 phases of the cell cycle generate more chromatids, the increased availability of template access for HR results in the up-regulation of the pathway. This rise is further increased due to the activation of CDK1 and the increase of RAD51 and RAD52 levels during G1 phase. Despite this, NHEJ not is inactive during the HR up-regulation. In fact, NHEJ was shown to be active throughout all stages of the cell cycle, and is favoured in G1 phase during low resection action intervals. This suggests the competition between HR and NHEJ for DSB repair in cells. It should be noted, however, that there is a shift of favour from NHEJ to HR when the cell cycle is progressing from G1 to S/G2 phases in eukaryotic cells.

==== During meiosis ====
In diploid eukaryotic organisms, the events of meiosis can be viewed as occurring in three steps. (1) Haploid gametes undergo syngamy/fertilisation with the result that chromosome sets of different parental origin come together to share the same nucleus. (2) Homologous chromosomes originating from different cells (i.e. non-sister chromosomes) align in pairs and undergo recombination involving double-strand break repair. (3) Two successive cell divisions (without duplication of chromosomes) result in haploid gametes that can then repeat the meiotic cycle. During step (2), damages in DNA of the germline can be removed by double-strand break repair. In particular, double-strand breaks in one duplex DNA molecule can be accurately repaired using information from a homologous intact DNA molecule by the process of homologous recombination.

== Defective DSB repair ==
Although there is no universal model to explain disease etiology caused by DNA repair deficiency, it is said that the accumulation of unrepaired DNA damage may lead to various diseases, including various metabolic syndromes and types of cancers. Some examples of diseases caused by defects of DSB repair mechanisms are listed below:

- Fanconi Anemia (FA) and Hereditary breast and ovarian cancer (HBOC) syndrome are caused by defects in homologous recombination. Biallelic mutation of either BRCA1/2 gene results in the loss of homologous recombination activity.
- Chordomas, a rare bone tumour, might suggest defects in homologous recombination and mutations affecting HR-related genes. Other syndromes and defects that have been proven to be associated with HR defects in mouse models are developmental defects, early onset breast cancer, and genetic instability.
- Defects in the NHEJ mechanism are related to the mutations in hRAD50 and/or hMRE11 genes in mismatch repair deficient tumors. Other complications associated with in vivo deficient NHEJ include; genomic instability, immunodeficiency, growth retardation, embryonic development, and cancer predisposition.

=== Aging ===
Women tend to live longer than men and the gender gap in life expectancy suggests differences in the ageing process between the sexes. Sex specific differences in DNA double-strand break repair of cycling human lymphocytes during aging were studied. It was found that the repair of DNA double-strand breaks changes upon aging and the changes are distinct in men and women.

=== Cancer ===
Activation of gene transcription during oncogenesis is often associated with the introduction of DNA double-strand breaks and their repair by a process employing RAD51. This transcription-coupled DNA repair tends to occur in specific regions of the DNA termed super-enhancers.

== See also ==
- DNA damage & repair
- Homologous Recombination
- Synthesis-dependent strain annealing
- Non-homologous end joining
- Microhomology-mediated end joining
- Cell cycle
- DNA synthesis
