= RAD51 =

Protein involved in DNA repair

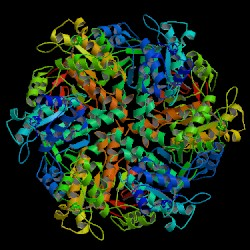

Identifiers
- Aliases: RAD51, BRCC5, FANCR, HHsRad51, HsT16930, MRMV2, RAD51A, RECA, RAD51 recombinase
- External IDs: OMIM: 179617; MGI: 97890; GeneCards: RAD51
Available structures
PDB	Ortholog search: PDBe RCSB
PDB	List of PDB id codes 1N0W, 1B22

Gene location (Human)
Chr.	Chromosome 15 (human)
Band	15q15.1	Start	40,694,774 bp
Band	15q15.1	End	40,732,340 bp
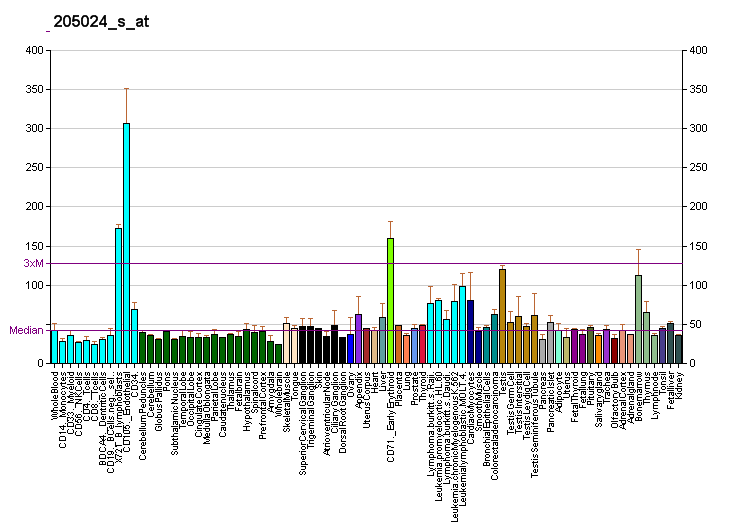

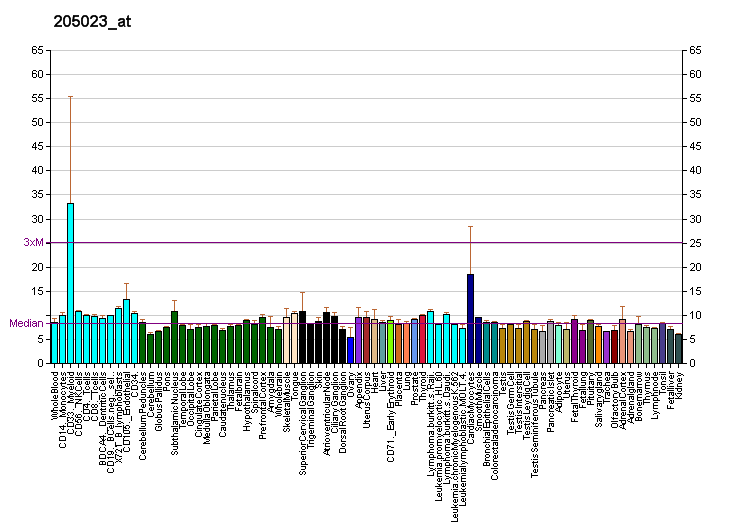
RNA expression pattern
Bgee	Human / Mouse (ortholog); Top expressed in: gonad; buccal mucosa cell; ventricular zone; embryo; ganglionic eminence; left testis; right testis; mucosa of transverse colon; testicle; bone marrow cell / n/a; More reference expression data
BioGPS	More reference expression data
Gene ontology
Molecular function	nucleotide binding; DNA binding; ATP-dependent activity, acting on DNA; DNA strand exchange activity; DNA polymerase binding; protein C-terminus binding; protein binding; four-way junction DNA binding; identical protein binding; endodeoxyribonuclease activity; ATP binding; single-stranded DNA binding; double-stranded DNA binding; single-stranded DNA helicase activity; chromatin binding; enzyme binding
Cellular component	cytoplasm; site of double-strand break; PML body; cytoskeleton; nucleoplasm; microtubule organizing center; nuclear chromosome; mitochondrial matrix; nucleolus; mitochondrion; perinuclear region of cytoplasm; chromatin; nucleus; cytosol; protein-containing complex; condensed chromosome; condensed nuclear chromosome; lateral element; chromosome
Biological process	strand invasion; mitotic recombination-dependent replication fork processing; reciprocal meiotic recombination; DNA recombination; regulation of double-strand break repair via homologous recombination; DNA metabolic process; positive regulation of DNA ligation; cellular response to camptothecin; double-strand break repair via homologous recombination; cellular response to ionizing radiation; mitotic recombination; protein homooligomerization; DNA repair; DNA unwinding involved in DNA replication; cellular response to DNA damage stimulus; interstrand cross-link repair; DNA recombinase assembly; negative regulation of G0 to G1 transition; telomere maintenance via recombination; telomere maintenance via telomere lengthening; replication fork processing; meiosis; chromosome organization involved in meiotic cell cycle
Sources:Amigo / QuickGO
Orthologs
Databases	NCBI: entry; OMA: entry
Species	Human	Mouse
Entrez	5888	19361
Ensembl	ENSG00000051180	n/a
UniProt	Q06609	Q08297
RefSeq (mRNA)	NM_001164269; NM_001164270; NM_002875; NM_133487	NM_011234
RefSeq (protein)	NP_001157741; NP_001157742; NP_002866; NP_597994	NP_035364
Location (UCSC)	Chr 15: 40.69 – 40.73 Mb	n/a
PubMed search
- Wikidata
View/Edit Human	View/Edit Mouse

DNA repair protein RAD51 homolog 1 is a protein encoded by the gene RAD51. The enzyme encoded by this gene is a member of the RAD51 protein family which assists in repair of DNA double strand breaks and is essential for homologous recombination. RAD51 family members are homologous to the bacterial RecA, Archaeal RadA, and yeast Rad51. The protein is highly conserved in most eukaryotes, from yeast to humans.

The name RAD51 derives from radiation sensitive protein 51.

== Variants ==
Two alternatively spliced transcript variants of this gene have been reported, which encode distinct proteins. Transcript variants utilizing alternative polyA signals also exist.

== Family ==
In mammals, seven recA-like genes have been identified: Rad51, Rad51L1/B, Rad51L2/C, Rad51L3/D, XRCC2, XRCC3, and DMC1/Lim15. All of these proteins, with the exception of meiosis-specific DMC1, are essential for development in mammals. Rad51 is a member of the RecA-like NTPases.

== Function ==
In humans, RAD51 is a 339-amino acid protein that plays a major role in homologous recombination of DNA during double strand break repair. In this repair process, an ATP-dependent DNA strand exchange takes place in which a template strand invades base-paired strands of homologous DNA molecules. RAD51 is involved in the search for homology and strand pairing stages of the process.

Unlike other proteins involved in DNA metabolism, the RecA/Rad51 family forms a helical nucleoprotein filament on DNA.

This protein can interact with the ssDNA-binding protein RPA, BRCA2, PALB2 and RAD52.

The structural basis for Rad51 filament formation and its functional mechanism still remain poorly understood. However, recent studies using fluorescent labeled Rad51 have indicated that Rad51 fragments elongate via multiple nucleation events followed by growth, with the total fragment terminating when it reaches about 2 μm in length. However, disassociation of Rad51 from dsDNA is slow and incomplete, suggesting that there is a separate mechanism that accomplishes this.

== RAD51 expression in cancer ==
In eukaryotes, the RAD51 protein has a central role in homologous recombinational repair, where it catalyses strand transfer between a broken sequence and its undamaged homologue, enabling re-synthesis of the damaged region (see homologous recombination models).

Numerous studies report that RAD51 is over-expressed in different cancers (see Table 1). In many of these studies, elevated expression of RAD51 is correlated with decreased patient survival. However, there are also some reports of under-expression of RAD51 in cancers (see Table 1).

Where RAD51 expression was quantified in conjunction with BRCA1 expression, an inverse correlation was found. This has been interpreted as selection, given that increased RAD51 expression and thus increased homologous recombinational repair (HRR) (by the HRR RAD52-RAD51 back-up pathway) may compensate for the accumulation of DNA damage arising from deficient BRCA1.

Furthermore, many cancers have epigenetic deficiencies in various DNA repair genes (see Frequencies of epimutations in DNA repair genes in cancers) that can suppress their expression, likely leading to increases in unrepaired DNA damage. RAD51 overexpression seen in many cancers may therefore be compensatory (as seen in BRCA1 deficiency), resulting in increased HRR that may enable cancer cell survival by partially ameliorating the excess of DNA damage.

Under-expression of RAD51 would lead to increases in unrepaired DNA damage. When these DNA lesions are unrepaired, replication errors can occur near to the damaged sites (see translesion synthesis), leading to increased mutations and cancer.

Table 1. RAD51 expression reported in sporadic cancers
Cancer type	Change in expression observed	Frequency of altered expression observed in cancer samples studied	Evaluation method used	Ref.
Breast (invasive ductal)	Over-expression	-	Immunohistochemistry	
Breast (BRCA1-deficient)	Over-expression	-	Messenger RNA (mRNA)	
Breast (progesterone receptor negative)	Over-expression	-	Messenger RNA (mRNA)	
Breast (overall)	Under-expression	30%	Immunohistochemistry	
Pancreatic	Over-expression	74%	Immunohistochemistry	
Pancreatic	Over-expression	66%	Immunohistochemistry	
Head and neck (squamous)	Over-expression	75%	Immunohistochemistry	
Prostate	Over-expression	33%	Immunohistochemistry	
Non-small-cell lung cancer	Over-expression	29%	Immunohistochemistry	
Soft tissue sarcoma	Over-expression	95%	Immunohistochemistry	
Esophageal squamous cell cancer	Over-expression	47%	Immunohistochemistry	
Renal cell carcinoma	Under-expression	100%	Western (protein) blotting and mRNA	

== Role in double-strand break repair ==
Double-strand break (DSB) repair by homologous recombination is initiated by 5' to 3' strand resection (DSB resection). In humans, DNA2 nuclease resects the 5'-to-3' strand at the DSB to generate a 3' single-strand DNA (ssDNA) overhang.

In vertebrates, a number of RAD51 paralogs (see Figure) are essential for RAD51 protein recruitment or stabilization at sites of DNA damage.

Protein domains in homologous recombination-related proteins are conserved across the three main groups of life: archaea, bacteria and eukaryotes.

In vertebrates and plants, five paralogs of RAD51 are expressed in somatic cells, including RAD51B (RAD51L1), RAD51C (RAD51L2), RAD51D (RAD51L3), XRCC2 and XRCC3. They each share about 25% amino acid sequence identity with RAD51 and with each other.

Outside of plants and vertebrates, a much broader diversity of Rad51 recombinase paralog proteins exist. In budding yeast (Saccharomyces cerevisiae), the paralogs Rad55 and Rad57 form a heterodimer that associates with the SHU complex to assemble the six-subunit RRS complex, which recruits Rad51 to ssDNA and promotes Rad51 filament nucleation. The recombinase paralog rfs-1 is found in the round worm Caenorhabditis elegans, however it is not essential for homologous recombination. Among archaea, RadB and RadC recombinase paralogs are found in many organisms belonging to Euryarchaeota, while a broader diversity of related recombinase paralogs are found in Crenarchaea, including Ral1, Ral2, Ral3, RadC, RadC1, and RadC2.

The RAD51 paralogs contribute to efficient DNA double-strand break repair by homologous recombination. Consequently, experimental depletion of these paralogs often result in significantly reduced homologous recombination.

The paralogs form two identified complexes: BCDX2 (RAD51B-RAD51C-RAD51D-XRCC2) and CX3 (RAD51C-XRCC3). These two complexes act at two different stages of homologous recombinational DNA repair. The BCDX2 complex is responsible for RAD51 recruitment or stabilization at damage sites. The BCDX2 complex appears to act by facilitating the assembly or stability of the RAD51 nucleoprotein filament. The CX3 complex acts downstream of RAD51 recruitment to damage sites.

Another complex, the BRCA1-PALB2-BRCA2 complex, cooperates with the RAD51 paralogs to load RAD51 onto ssDNA coated with RPA to form the essential recombination intermediate, the RAD51-ssDNA filament.

In mice and humans, the BRCA2 complex primarily mediates orderly assembly of RAD51 on ssDNA, which is an active substrate in homologous pairing and strand invasion. BRCA2 also redirects RAD51 from dsDNA and prevents its dissociation from ssDNA. However, in the presence of a BRCA2 mutation, human RAD52 can mediate RAD51 assembly on ssDNA and substitute for BRCA2 in homologous recombinational DNA repair, though with lower efficiency than BRCA2.

Further steps are detailed in the article Homologous recombination.

== Meiosis ==
Rad51 has a crucial function in meiotic prophase in mice, with Rad51 knockout leading to a depletion of late prophase I spermatocytes.

During meiosis, the two recombinases, Rad51 and Dmc1, interact with single-stranded DNA to form specialized filaments that are adapted for facilitating recombination between homologous chromosomes. Both Rad51 and Dmc1 have an intrinsic ability to self-aggregate. The presence of Dmc1 stabilizes the adjacent Rad51 filaments suggesting that cross-talk between these two recombinases may affect their biochemical properties.

== Chemotherapy and aging ==
In aged and chemotherapy treated females, oocytes and follicles are depleted by apoptosis (programmed cell death) leading to ovarian failure. DNA damage-induced oocyte apoptosis depends on the efficiency of the DNA repair machinery that in turn declines with age. Survival of oocytes following chemotherapy or aging can be enhanced by increased expression of Rad51. The Rad51-induced oocyte resistance to apoptosis is likely due to Rad51's central role in homologous recombinational repair of DNA damage.

== MicroRNA control of RAD51 expression ==
In mammals, microRNAs (miRNAs) regulate about 60% of the transcriptional activity of protein-encoding genes. Some miRNAs also undergo methylation-associated silencing in cancer cells. If a repressive miRNA is silenced by hypermethylation or deletion, then the gene it typically targets becomes over-expressed.

At least eight miRNAs repressing RAD51 expression have been identified, with five of these appearing significant in cancer. For instance, in triple-negative breast cancers (TNBC), over-expression of miR-155 was reported to coincide with RAD51 repression. Further study demonstrated that transfecting breast cancer cells with a vector over-expressing miR-155 represses RAD51 expression, resulting in decreased homologous recombination and increased sensitivity to ionizing radiation.

Four further miRNAs that repress RAD51 (miR-148b* and miR-193b*, miR-506, and miR-34a) are under-expressed in cancers, presumably leading to induction of RAD51 expression, with under-expression of miR-148b and miR-193b causing an observed induction of RAD51 expression. Furthermore, deletions of miR-148b* and miR-193b* in serous ovarian tumors correlates with increased losses of heterozygosity (LOH), which may be carcinogenic. This is thought to arise from increased RAD51 expression that can drive excess recombination.

Under-expression of miR-506 is associated with both faster cancer recurrence and reduced survival in epithelial ovarian cancer patients.

Methylation of the promoter of miR-34a, which leads to miR-34a under-expression, is observed in 79% of prostate cancers and 63% of primary melanomas. Reduced miR-34a expression has also been observed in 63% of non-small cell lung cancers, and 36% of colon cancers, and is generally also under-expressed in primary neuroblastomas.

Table 2 summarizes these five microRNAs and the nature of their altered expression in cancers where it has been observed.

Table 2. Altered expression of microRNAs that affect RAD51 expression in sporadic cancers
MicroRNA	Change in miRNA expression	Cancer	Ref.
miR-155	Over-expression	Triple-negative breast cancer	
miR-148b*	Under-expression	Ovarian cancer	
miR-193b*	Under-expression	Ovarian cancer	
miR-506	Under-expression	Ovarian cancer	
miR-34a	Under-expression	Prostate cancer and melanoma	
		Non-small cell lung cancer	
		Colon cancer	
		Neuroblastoma	

Three other microRNAs have been identified, by various criteria, as likely to repress RAD51 (miR-96, miR-203, and miR-103/107). These microRNAs were then tested by over-expressing them in cells in vitro, and they were found to indeed repress RAD51. This repression was generally associated with decreased HR and increased sensitivity of the cells to DNA damaging agents.

== Pathology ==
=== Cancer ===
This protein is also found to interact with PALB2 and BRCA2, which may be important for the cellular response to DNA damage. BRCA2 is shown to regulate both the intracellular localization and DNA-binding ability of this protein. Loss of these controls following BRCA2 inactivation may be a key event leading to genomic instability and tumorigenesis.

Several alterations of the Rad51 gene have been associated with an increased risk of developing breast cancer. The breast cancer susceptibility protein BRCA2 and PALB2 controls the function of Rad51 in the pathway for DNA repair by homologous recombination. In addition to the data listed in Table 1, increased RAD51 expression levels have been identified in metastatic canine mammary carcinoma, indicating that genomic instability plays an important role in the carcinogenesis of this tumor type.

=== Fanconi anemia ===
Fanconi anemia (FA) is a hereditary condition characterized by cellular hypersensitivity to DNA cross-linking agents. A dominant negative mutation in the Rad51 gene has been reported to give rise to an FA-like phenotype with features of intellectual disability. This report included evidence that Rad51-mediated homologous recombinational repair likely has an important role in neurodevelopment.

=== Congenital mirror movements ===
Mutations in Rad51 have been linked to both sporadic and familial cases of congenital mirror movement disorder. In neurons, a novel role for Rad51 has been identified in the regulation of Netrin signalling and axon misguidance phenotypes. This role is not clearly linked to its known DNA repair function.

== Interactions ==
RAD51 has been shown to interact with:

- Abl gene,
- Ataxia telangiectasia mutated,
- BARD1,
- BRCA1,
- BRCA2,
- BRCC3,
- BRE,
- Bloom syndrome protein,
- DMC1,
- RAD54,
- P53
- RAD52,
- RAD54B, and
- UBE2I.
