= XRCC3 =

Protein-coding gene in the species Homo sapiens

Identifiers
- Aliases: XRCC3, CMM6, X-ray repair complementing defective repair in Chinese hamster cells 3, X-ray repair cross complementing 3
- External IDs: OMIM: 600675; MGI: 1921585; GeneCards: XRCC3

Gene location (Human)
| Chr. | Chromosome 14 (human) |
| Band | 14q32.33 | Start | 103,697,609 bp |
| Band | 14q32.33 | End | 103,715,504 bp |

Gene location (Mouse)
| Chr. | Chromosome 12 (mouse) |
| Band | 12|12 F1 | Start | 111,769,626 bp |
| Band | 12|12 F1 | End | 111,780,307 bp |
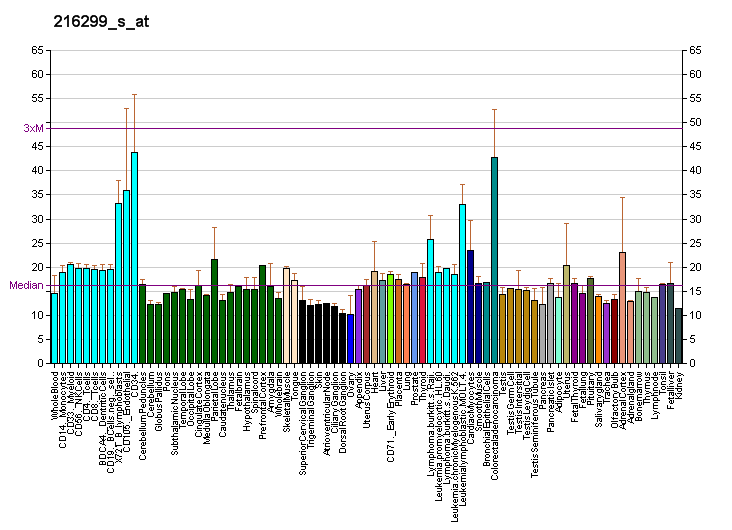
RNA expression pattern
| Bgee | Human / Mouse (ortholog); Top expressed in: gastric mucosa; canal of the cervix; right uterine tube; ectocervix; right coronary artery; tibial nerve; apex of heart; right ovary; body of uterus; left ovary / Top expressed in: yolk sac; zygote; primary oocyte; genital tubercle; secondary oocyte; lumbar subsegment of spinal cord; Paneth cell; tail of embryo; lip; hand; More reference expression data |
| BioGPS | More reference expression data |
Gene ontology
| Molecular function | crossover junction endodeoxyribonuclease activity; nucleotide binding; DNA binding; ATP-dependent activity, acting on DNA; DNA strand exchange activity; single-stranded DNA binding; protein binding; four-way junction DNA binding; double-stranded DNA binding; ATP binding |
| Cellular component | cytoplasm; replication fork; nucleoplasm; Rad51C-XRCC3 complex; mitochondrion; perinuclear region of cytoplasm; Rad51B-Rad51C-Rad51D-XRCC2 complex; nucleus; cytosol |
| Biological process | strand invasion; response to ionizing radiation; positive regulation of mitotic cell cycle spindle assembly checkpoint; reciprocal meiotic recombination; DNA recombination; regulation of centrosome duplication; resolution of mitotic recombination intermediates; response to organic substance; cellular response to DNA damage stimulus; telomere maintenance via recombination; t-circle formation; DNA repair; meiotic DNA recombinase assembly; interstrand cross-link repair; double-strand break repair via homologous recombination; telomeric loop disassembly; telomere maintenance via telomere trimming; double-strand break repair via synthesis-dependent strand annealing |
Sources:Amigo / QuickGO
Orthologs
| Databases | NCBI: entry; OMA: entry |
| Species | Human | Mouse |
| Entrez | 7517 | 74335 |
| Ensembl | ENSG00000126215 | ENSMUSG00000021287 |
| UniProt | O43542 | Q9CXE6 |
| RefSeq (mRNA) | NM_001100118; NM_001100119; NM_005432; NM_001371229; NM_001371231 NM_001371232 | NM_028875 |
| RefSeq (protein) | NP_001093588; NP_001093589; NP_005423; NP_001358158; NP_001358160 NP_001358161 | NP_083151 |
| Location (UCSC) | Chr 14: 103.7 – 103.72 Mb | Chr 12: 111.77 – 111.78 Mb |
| PubMed search |
- Wikidata
| View/Edit Human | View/Edit Mouse |

DNA repair protein XRCC3 is a protein that in humans is encoded by the XRCC3 gene.

== Function ==
This gene encodes a member of the RecA/Rad51-related protein family that participates in homologous recombination to maintain chromosome stability and repair DNA damage. This gene functionally complements Chinese hamster irs1SF, a repair-deficient mutant that exhibits hypersensitivity to a number of different DNA-damaging agents and is chromosomally unstable. A rare microsatellite polymorphism in this gene is associated with cancer in patients of varying radiosensitivity.

The XRCC3 protein is one of five paralogs of RAD51, including RAD51B (RAD51L1), RAD51C (RAD51L2), RAD51D (RAD51L3), XRCC2 and XRCC3. They each share about 25% amino acid sequence identity with RAD51 and each other.

The RAD51 paralogs are all required for efficient DNA double-strand break repair by homologous recombination and depletion of any paralog results in significant decreases in homologous recombination frequency.

Two paralogs form a complex designated CX3 (RAD51C-XRCC3). Four paralogs form a second complex designated BCDX2 (RAD51B-RAD51C-RAD51D-XRCC2). These two complexes act at two different stages of homologous recombinational DNA repair.

The CX3 complex acts downstream of RAD51, after its recruitment to damage sites. The CX3 complex associates with Holliday junction resolvase activity, probably in a role of stabilizing gene conversion tracts.

The BCDX2 complex is responsible for RAD51 recruitment or stabilization at damage sites. The BCDX2 complex appears to act by facilitating the assembly or stability of the RAD51 nucleoprotein filament.

== Interactions ==
XRCC3 has been shown to interact with RAD51C.

== Epigenetic deficiency in cancer ==
There is an epigenetic cause of XRCC3 deficiency that appears to increase cancer risk. This is the repression of XRCC3 by over-expression of EZH2 protein.

Increased expression of EZH2 leads to epigenetic repression of RAD51 paralogs, including XRCC3, and thus reduces homologous recombinational repair. This reduction was proposed to be a cause of breast cancer. EZH2 is the catalytic subunit of Polycomb Repressor Complex 2 (PRC2) which catalyzes methylation of histone H3 at lysine 27 (H3K27me) and mediates gene silencing of target genes via local chromatin reorganization. EZH2 protein is up-regulated in numerous cancers. EZH2 mRNA is up-regulated, on average, 7.5-fold in breast cancer, and between 40% and 75% of breast cancers have over-expressed EZH2 protein.

== Interactive pathway map ==
Click on genes, proteins and metabolites below to link to respective articles. (Note: The interactive pathway map can be edited at WikiPathways: "FluoropyrimidineActivity_WP1601".)

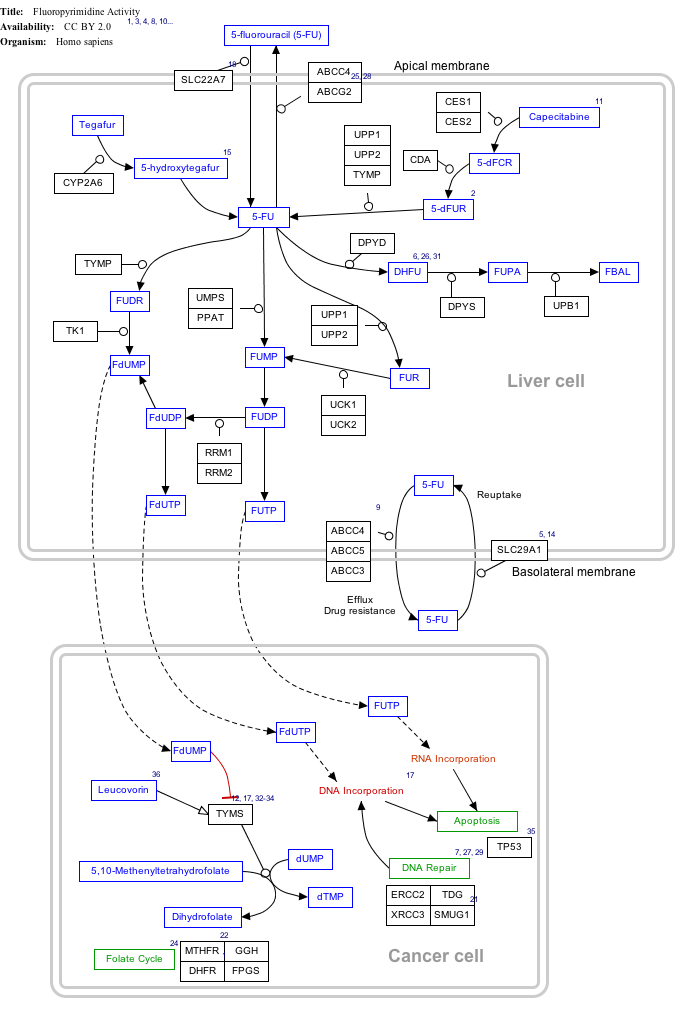

Fluorouracil (5-FU) Activity edit

== See also ==
- XRCC2
