= SEM1 =

Protein-coding gene in humans

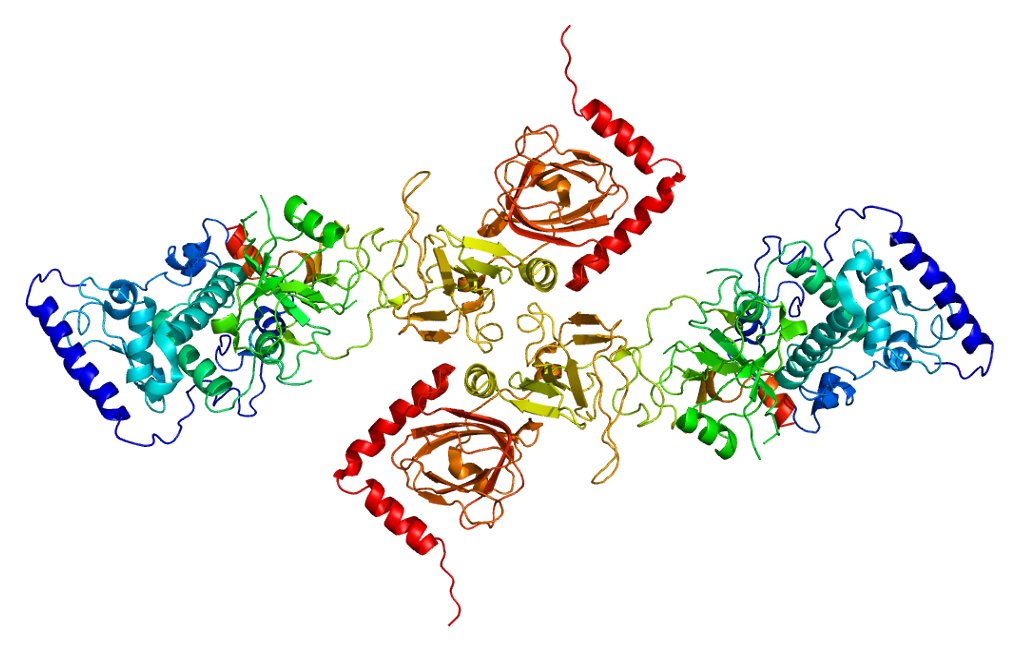

Identifiers
- Aliases: SEM1, DSS1, ECD, SHFD1, SHSF1, Shfdg1, SHFM1, split hand/foot malformation (ectrodactyly) type 1
- External IDs: OMIM: 601285; MGI: 109238; GeneCards: SEM1
Available structures
PDB	Ortholog search: PDBe RCSB
PDB	List of PDB id codes 1IYJ, 1MIU, 1MJE, 3T5X

Gene location (Mouse)
Chr.	Chromosome 6 (mouse)
Band	6|6 A1	Start	6,557,294 bp
Band	6|6 A1	End	6,578,663 bp
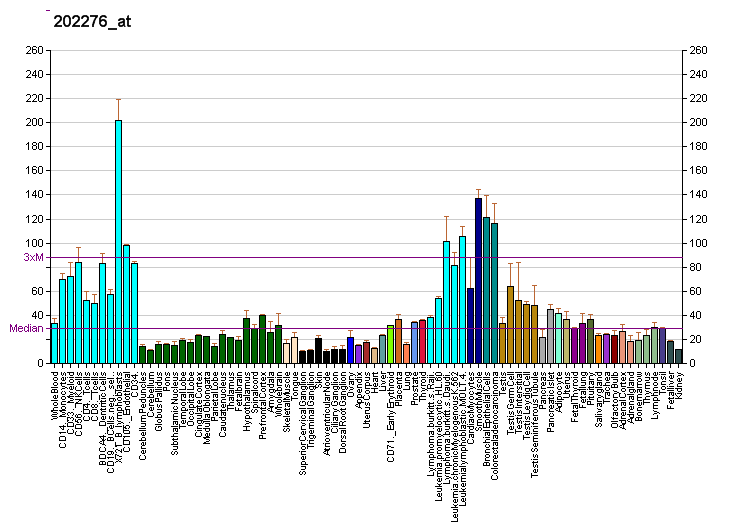
RNA expression pattern
Bgee	Human / Mouse (ortholog); n/a / Top expressed in: mandibular prominence; maxillary prominence; endothelial cell of lymphatic vessel; medullary collecting duct; body of femur; medial ganglionic eminence; hair follicle; primitive streak; abdominal wall; dermis
BioGPS	More reference expression data
Gene ontology
Molecular function	protein binding
Cellular component	integrator complex; proteasome complex; proteasome regulatory particle, lid subcomplex; nucleoplasm; cytosol
Biological process	mRNA export from nucleus; proteasome assembly; protein deubiquitination; post-translational protein modification; double-strand break repair via homologous recombination; MAPK cascade; protein polyubiquitination; stimulatory C-type lectin receptor signaling pathway; antigen processing and presentation of exogenous peptide antigen via MHC class I, TAP-dependent; regulation of cellular amino acid metabolic process; negative regulation of G2/M transition of mitotic cell cycle; anaphase-promoting complex-dependent catabolic process; SCF-dependent proteasomal ubiquitin-dependent protein catabolic process; tumor necrosis factor-mediated signaling pathway; NIK/NF-kappaB signaling; Fc-epsilon receptor signaling pathway; proteasome-mediated ubiquitin-dependent protein catabolic process; regulation of mRNA stability; T cell receptor signaling pathway; transmembrane transport; Wnt signaling pathway, planar cell polarity pathway; regulation of transcription from RNA polymerase II promoter in response to hypoxia; interleukin-1-mediated signaling pathway; negative regulation of canonical Wnt signaling pathway; positive regulation of canonical Wnt signaling pathway; regulation of mitotic cell cycle phase transition; regulation of hematopoietic stem cell differentiation
Sources:Amigo / QuickGO
Orthologs
Databases	NCBI: entry; OMA: entry
Species	Human	Mouse
Entrez	7979	20422
Ensembl	ENSG00000127922	ENSMUSG00000042541
UniProt	P60896; Q6ZVN7	P60897
RefSeq (mRNA)	NM_006304	NM_009169
RefSeq (protein)	NP_006295; NP_001188379; NP_001188380; NP_001336627; NP_001336629 NP_001336630; NP_001336631; NP_006295	NP_033195
Location (UCSC)	n/a	Chr 6: 6.56 – 6.58 Mb
PubMed search
- Wikidata
View/Edit Human	View/Edit Mouse

26S proteasome complex subunit SEM1 is a protein that in humans is encoded by the SEM1 gene (previously SHFM1). In yeast biology and general proteasome nomenclature, it is referred to as Rpn15 (Regulatory Particle Non-ATPase subunit 15).

== Function ==
The product of this gene has been localized within the split hand/split foot malformation locus SHFM1 at chromosome 7. It has been proposed to be a candidate gene for the autosomal dominant form of the heterogeneous limb developmental disorder split hand/split foot malformation type 1. In addition, it has been shown to directly interact with BRCA2. It also may play a role in the completion of the cell cycle.

== Interactions ==
SHFM1 has been shown to interact with BRCA2.
