= RAD54L =

Protein-coding gene in humans

Identifiers
- Aliases: RAD54L, HR54, RAD54A, hHR54, hRAD54, RAD54-like (S. cerevisiae), RAD54 like (S. cerevisiae), RAD54 like
- External IDs: OMIM: 603615; MGI: 894697; GeneCards: RAD54L

Gene location (Human)
Chr.	Chromosome 1 (human)
Band	1p34.1	Start	46,246,461 bp
Band	1p34.1	End	46,278,480 bp

Gene location (Mouse)
Chr.	Chromosome 4 (mouse)
Band	4|4 D1	Start	115,951,461 bp
Band	4|4 D1	End	115,980,887 bp
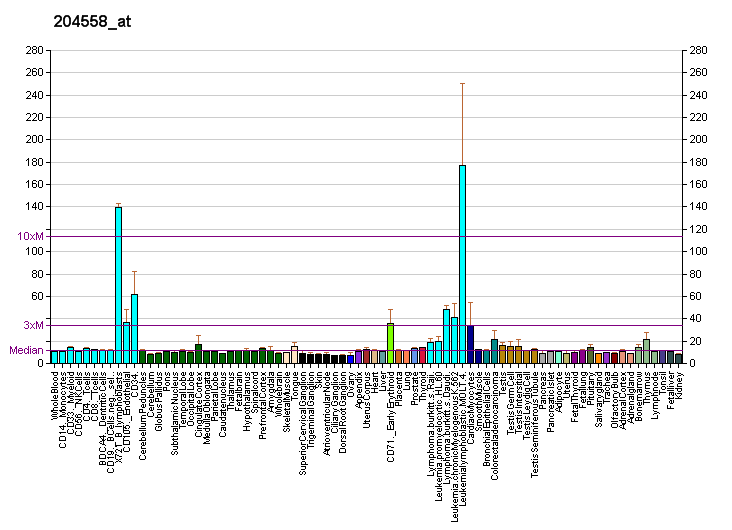
RNA expression pattern
Bgee	Human / Mouse (ortholog); Top expressed in: left testis; right testis; ventricular zone; ganglionic eminence; gonad; testicle; mucosa of transverse colon; cerebellar hemisphere; right hemisphere of cerebellum; gastrocnemius muscle / Top expressed in: primitive streak; otic placode; otic vesicle; tail of embryo; tibiofemoral joint; maxillary prominence; mandibular prominence; fetal liver hematopoietic progenitor cell; epiblast; genital tubercle; More reference expression data
BioGPS	More reference expression data
Gene ontology
Molecular function	ATP-dependent DNA/DNA annealing activity; DNA binding; nucleotide binding; protein binding; hydrolase activity; ATP binding; helicase activity
Cellular component	nucleoplasm; nucleus; protein-containing complex
Biological process	response to ionizing radiation; DNA recombination; double-strand break repair; double-strand break repair via homologous recombination; determination of adult lifespan; chromosome organization; cellular response to DNA damage stimulus; DNA repair; meiosis
Sources:Amigo / QuickGO
Orthologs
Databases	NCBI: entry; OMA: entry
Species	Human	Mouse
Entrez	8438	19366
Ensembl	ENSG00000085999	ENSMUSG00000028702
UniProt	Q92698	P70270
RefSeq (mRNA)	NM_001142548; NM_003579; NM_001370766	NM_001122958; NM_001122959; NM_009015
RefSeq (protein)	NP_001136020; NP_003570; NP_001357695	NP_001116430; NP_001116431; NP_033041
Location (UCSC)	Chr 1: 46.25 – 46.28 Mb	Chr 4: 115.95 – 115.98 Mb
PubMed search
- Wikidata
View/Edit Human	View/Edit Mouse

DNA repair and recombination protein RAD54-like is a protein that in humans is encoded by the RAD54L gene.

The protein encoded by this gene belongs to the DEAD-like helicase superfamily, and shares similarity with Saccharomyces cerevisiae Rad54, a protein known to be involved in the homologous recombination and repair of DNA. This protein has been shown to play a role in homologous recombination related repair of DNA double-strand breaks. The binding of this protein to double-strand DNA induces a DNA topological change, which is thought to facilitate homologous DNA pairing, and stimulate DNA recombination.

RAD54 is one of the key proteins necessary for homologous recombination and DNA repair in many organisms. Without functional RAD54, tumor development is more likely. RAD54 was initially described in the budding yeast Saccharomyces cerevisiae as being a member of the evolutionarily conserved RAD52 epistasis group, which additionally includes RAD51, RAD52, RAD55, and RAD57 factors. This group is believed to be involved in DNA recombination events and repair mechanisms, especially those involving double-stranded DNA breaks during both mitosis and meiosis. Recently a human homologue of the yeast RAD54 was discovered and termed hRAD54.

== Human gene ==
Human RAD54, or hRAD54, is linked to chromosome 1p32. It encodes a protein, composed of 747 amino acids, that is 52% identical to its yeast counterpart. These two proteins also share many functional similarities. The RAD54 encoded product is a member of the Swi2/Snf2 protein family, a member of the Swi2/Snf2 subfamily of ATPases. These protein products have homology in seven conserved helicase motifs. Purified hRAD54 has been shown to specifically exhibit DNA-dependent ATPase and supercoiling activities. hRAD54 transcripts are expressed primarily in the testis and thymus, with lower levels being found also in the small intestines, colon, breast, and prostate. Mutants of hRAD54 are extremely sensitive to x-rays, as well as methyl methanesulfonate (MMS). These mutants are most likely defective in both the spontaneous and induced mitotic recombination processes.

== Function ==
The interaction between RAD54 and RAD51, another member of the RAD52 epistasis group, in humans is mediated by the N-terminal domain of the hRAD54 protein. This N-terminal end interacts with both the free and bound ends of the RAD51 protein. RAD54 moves along the length of the DNA, producing positive supercoils ahead of the replication protein movement and negative supercoils trailing the complex. The interaction with RAD51 enhances the ability of RAD54 to perform this supercoiling and strained opening activity. These proteins also work together to form DNA joints, with RAD54 specifically extending the joints and stabilizing the D-loops formed. An alternative function of RAD54 may be to remove RAD51 proteins after joints formation and recombination initiation has occurred.

== Inactivation and cancer susceptibility ==
Defects in RAD51 are known to be associated with tumor development. Normally, RAD51 interacts with both BRCA1 and BRCA2 protein products to cause tumor suppression. This leads to the assumption that other members of the RAD52 epistasis group, including RAD54, are also important in tumor development and suppression because of their homologous relationship. RAD54's involvement as a necessary recombinational protein is supported in the finding that there are mutations of RAD54 in a small percentage of studied breast and colon carcinomas, as well as several lymphomas.

== Meiosis ==
The frequency of spontaneous chromosome breaks during meiosis was measured in the spermatocytes of both wild type mice and Rad54/Rad54B knockout mice. In the Rad54/Rad54B knockout mice, the spontaneous chromosome aberration frequency detected at metaphase 1 of meiosis was more than 10-fold higher than in the wild-type mice. This finding, and additional experimental findings, indicated that the RAD54/RAD54B proteins have a role in maintaining a stable karyotype during male meiosis.
