= RAD54B =

Protein-coding gene in the species Homo sapiens

Identifiers
- Aliases: RAD54B, RDH54, RAD54 homolog B (S. cerevisiae), RAD54 homolog B
- External IDs: OMIM: 604289; MGI: 3605986; GeneCards: RAD54B

Gene location (Human)
Chr.	Chromosome 8 (human)
Band	8q22.1	Start	94,371,960 bp
Band	8q22.1	End	94,475,115 bp

Gene location (Mouse)
Chr.	Chromosome 4 (mouse)
Band	4|4 A1	Start	11,558,922 bp
Band	4|4 A1	End	11,615,805 bp
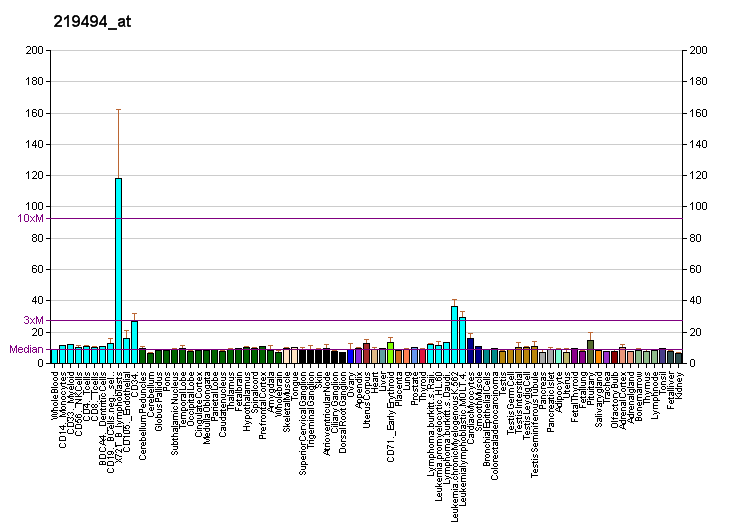
RNA expression pattern
Bgee	Human / Mouse (ortholog); Top expressed in: right uterine tube; gonad; testicle; ventricular zone; oocyte; secondary oocyte; ganglionic eminence; endometrium; retinal pigment epithelium; right lobe of liver / Top expressed in: otic vesicle; yolk sac; tail of embryo; genital tubercle; primary oocyte; zygote; morula; blastocyst; blastocyst; ventricular zone; More reference expression data
BioGPS	More reference expression data
Gene ontology
Molecular function	RNA helicase activity; DNA translocase activity; DNA binding; DNA helicase activity; nucleotide binding; hydrolase activity; ATP binding; helicase activity; protein binding; identical protein binding
Cellular component	nucleus
Biological process	reciprocal meiotic recombination; mitotic recombination; DNA repair; cellular response to DNA damage stimulus; DNA duplex unwinding; double-strand break repair via homologous recombination; regulation of transcription, DNA-templated; transcription, DNA-templated
Sources:Amigo / QuickGO
Orthologs
Databases	NCBI: entry; OMA: entry
Species	Human	Mouse
Entrez	25788	623474
Ensembl	ENSG00000197275	ENSMUSG00000078773
UniProt	Q9Y620; O95073	Q8BKE5; Q6PFE3
RefSeq (mRNA)	NM_001205262; NM_001205263; NM_006550; NM_012415; NM_134434	NM_001039556; NM_001256145; NM_177285
RefSeq (protein)	NP_001192191; NP_001192192; NP_036547; NP_001192191; NP_001192192 NP_036547	NP_001243071; NP_001034645; NP_001243074
Location (UCSC)	Chr 8: 94.37 – 94.48 Mb	Chr 4: 11.56 – 11.62 Mb
PubMed search
- Wikidata
View/Edit Human	View/Edit Mouse

DNA repair and recombination protein RAD54B is a protein that in humans is encoded by the RAD54B gene.

The protein encoded by this gene belongs to the DEAD-like helicase superfamily. It shares similarity with Saccharomyces cerevisiae RAD54 and RDH54, both of which are involved in homologous recombination and repair of DNA. This protein binds to double-stranded DNA, and displays ATPase activity in the presence of DNA. This gene is highly expressed in testis and spleen, which suggests active roles in meiotic and mitotic recombination. Homozygous mutations of this gene were observed in primary lymphoma and colon cancer.

== Interactions ==
RAD54B has been shown to interact with RAD51.

== Cancer ==
The RAD54B gene is somatically mutated or deleted in numerous types of cancer including colorectal cancer (~3.3%), breast cancer (~3.4%), and lung cancer (~2.6%). In North America, these three cancers alone account for about 20,500 individuals diagnosed annually with RAD54B defective cancer. In a pre-clinical study, colon cancer cells defective in RAD54B were determined to be selectively killed by inhibitors of the DNA repair protein PARP1. Inhibitors of PARP1 likely impede alternative DNA repair responses that might otherwise compensate for loss of the RAD54B pathway in cancer cells. Thus RAD54B-deficient cancer cells treated with a PARP1 inhibitor are apparently more vulnerable to killing by naturally occurring DNA damages than non-cancerous cells without a RAD54 defect (see article Synthetic lethality).
