= DNA meiotic recombinase 1 =

Protein-coding gene in the species Homo sapiens

DMC1
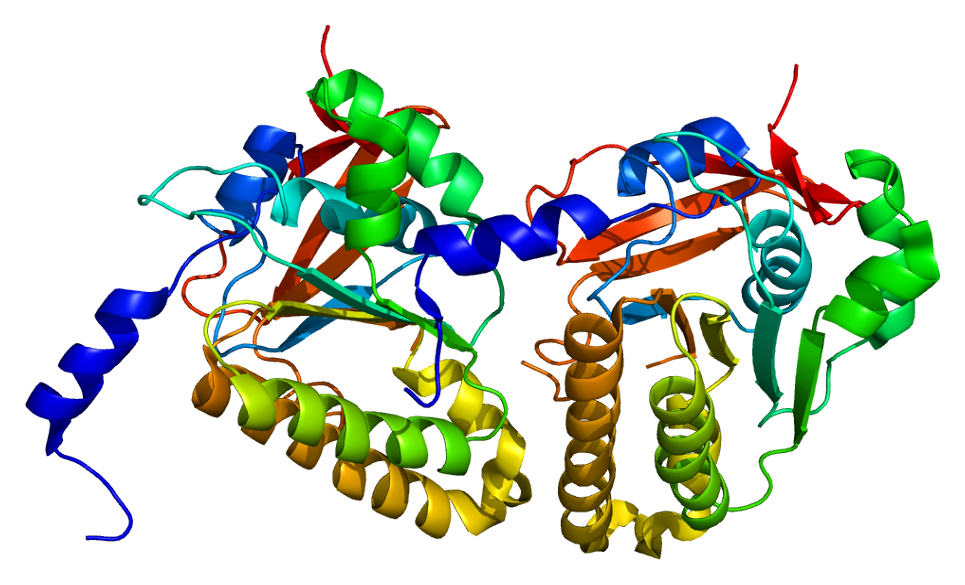

Identifiers
- Aliases: DMC1, DMC1H, LIM15, dJ199H16.1, DNA meiotic recombinase 1
- External IDs: OMIM: 602721; MGI: 105393; GeneCards: DMC1
Available structures
PDB	Ortholog search: PDBe RCSB
PDB	List of PDB id codes 1V5W, 2ZJB, 4HYY

Gene location (Human)
Chr.	Chromosome 22 (human)
Band	22q13.1	Start	38,518,948 bp
Band	22q13.1	End	38,570,204 bp

Gene location (Mouse)
Chr.	Chromosome 15 (mouse)
Band	15 E1|15 37.79 cM	Start	79,445,698 bp
Band	15 E1|15 37.79 cM	End	79,489,310 bp
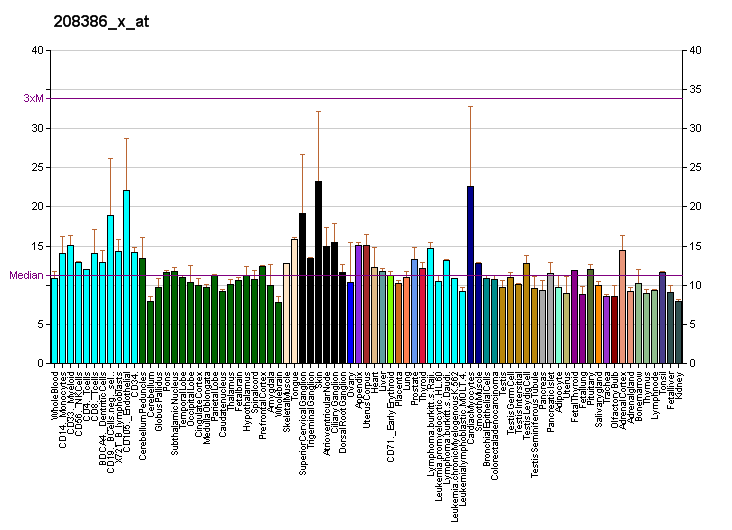

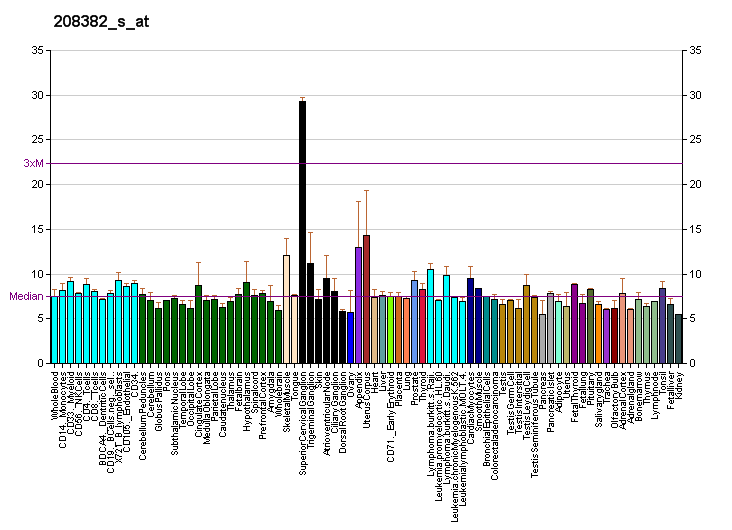
RNA expression pattern
Bgee	Human / Mouse (ortholog); Top expressed in: buccal mucosa cell; gonad; right testis; left testis; ventricular zone; testicle; Achilles tendon; ganglionic eminence; muscle of thigh; tonsil / Top expressed in: morula; seminiferous tubule; blastocyst; spermatid; embryo; secondary oocyte; embryo; granulocyte; primary oocyte; epiblast; More reference expression data
BioGPS	More reference expression data
Gene ontology
Molecular function	DNA binding; nucleotide binding; ATP-dependent activity, acting on DNA; DNA strand exchange activity; single-stranded DNA binding; protein binding; four-way junction DNA binding; double-stranded DNA binding; endodeoxyribonuclease activity; ATP binding
Cellular component	chromosome; nucleoplasm; telomere; nucleus; condensed nuclear chromosome
Biological process	strand invasion; response to ionizing radiation; DNA recombinase assembly; female gamete generation; male meiosis I; DNA metabolic process; gamete generation; homologous chromosome pairing at meiosis; oocyte maturation; spermatogenesis; spermatid development; ovarian follicle development; cell cycle; chromosome organization involved in meiotic cell cycle; mitotic recombination; DNA repair; reciprocal meiotic recombination; meiosis
Sources:Amigo / QuickGO
Orthologs
Databases	NCBI: entry; OMA: entry
Species	Human	Mouse
Entrez	11144	13404
Ensembl	ENSG00000100206	ENSMUSG00000022429
UniProt	Q14565	Q61880
RefSeq (mRNA)	NM_001278208; NM_007068; NM_001363017	NM_001278226; NM_010059
RefSeq (protein)	NP_001265137; NP_008999; NP_001349946	NP_001265155; NP_034189
Location (UCSC)	Chr 22: 38.52 – 38.57 Mb	Chr 15: 79.45 – 79.49 Mb
PubMed search
- Wikidata
View/Edit Human	View/Edit Mouse

Meiotic recombination protein DMC1/LIM15 homolog is a protein that in humans is encoded by the DMC1 gene. Homologs of DMC1 are well conserved and have been identified in many divergent organisms including fungi, plants and mammals including humans.

Meiotic recombination protein Dmc1 is a homolog of the bacterial strand exchange protein RecA. Dmc1 plays the central role in homologous recombination in meiosis by assembling at the sites of programmed DNA double strand breaks and carrying out a search for allelic DNA sequences located on homologous chromatids. The name "Dmc" stands for "disrupted meiotic cDNA" and refers to the method used for its discovery which involved using clones from a meiosis-specific cDNA library to direct knock-out mutations of abundantly expressed meiotic genes.

The Dmc1 protein is one of two homologs of RecA found in eukaryotic cells, the other being Rad51. DMC1 and RAD51 share over 50% amino acid similarity. In budding yeast, Rad51 serves as a strand exchange protein in mitosis where it is critical for the repair of DNA breaks. Rad51 is converted to an accessory factor for Dmc1 during meiosis by inhibition of its strand exchange activity.

== Discovery ==
The DMC1 gene and protein were discovered in the budding yeast S. cerevisiae by Douglas Bishop in 1992 when he was a postdoctoral fellow in the laboratory of Nancy Kleckner at Harvard University.

== Structure ==
Human DMC1 is a homomultimer in the form of an octameric ring with a diameter of 140 Å and a hole in the middle of 45 Å. DMC1 binds preferentially to ssDNA over dsDNA. Unlike RecA and Rad51, DMC1 does not appear to form a helical filament on DNA, instead forming rings with DNA passing through the center. hDMC1 can conduct D-loop formation in supercoiled DNA. DMC1 has weak ATPase activity and is able to promote heteroduplex formation in the presence of a non-hydrolysable analog of ATP, indicating a requirement for ATP binding over ATP hydrolysis. DMC1 also shows enhanced binding to nucleosomes with histone tails removed, indicating that chromosome architecture may play a role in DMC1 binding, but not Rad51.

== Function ==
The protein encoded by this gene is essential for meiotic homologous recombination. Genetic recombination in meiosis plays an important role in generating diversity of genetic information and facilitates the reductional segregation of chromosomes that must occur for formation of gametes during sexual reproduction.

During meiosis, programmed DNA double strand breaks (DSBs) are introduced by topoisomerase-like enzyme Spo11. DSBs are lengthened through the actions of exonucleases to trim the 5' ends and form long 3' single-stranded DNA (ssDNA) overhangs. These 3' overhangs are stabilized by the effects of single strand binding proteins (SSBs) to protect the ssDNA and prevent the formation of secondary structures. DMC1 is loaded onto the 3' ssDNA to form a right-handed helical nucleoprotein filament. Subsequently, this nucleoprotein filament conducts a homology search in a homologous DNA region. Single-strand invasion in a complementary region in the homologous chromosome by the 3'-ended DNA strand forms a heteroduplex in the form of a displacement loop (D-loop). This D-Loop is extended as DNA repair synthesis occurs, forming a Holliday junction. Resolution of this Holiday junction results in crossover or non-crossover product. Crossover products are generated to a lesser extent than non-crossover products.

Like other members of the Rad51/RecA family, Dmc1 stabilizes strand exchange intermediates (Rad1/RecA-stretched DNA, or RS-DNA) in stretched triplets similar to B form DNA. Each molecule of the protein binds a triplet of nucleotides, and the strength of that binding, as assessed by the change in Gibbs free energy, can be assessed by the length of time that a labelled dsDNA probe with a short homologous sequence remains bound to a DNA containing a short region of homology to it. A study of this type has shown that a mismatch in any of the three positions at the end of a stretch of homology will not increase the length of time that the probe remains bound, and in Rad51 or RecA constructs an internal mismatch will cause a similar reduction in binding time. All of the enzymes are capable of "stepping over" a mismatch and continuing to bind the probe more firmly if a longer region of homology exists. However, with Dmc1 a triplet with a single internal (but not terminal) mismatch will contribute to the stability of probe binding to a similar extent as one without a mismatch. In this way, Dmc1 is specially suited to its role as a meiosis-specific recombinase, as this activity permits it more effectively to catalyze recombination between sequences that are not perfectly matched.

== Interactions ==
DMC1 (gene) has been shown to interact with RAD51 and the Structural Maintenance of Chromosome 5/6 (SMC5/6) complex. The protein has also been shown to bind Tid1(Rdh54), Mei5/Sae3, and Hop2/Mnd1. All of these interacting proteins act to enhance Dmc1's activity in purified systems and are also implicated as being required for Dmc1 function in cells.

DMC1 has also been shown to interact with FIGNL1. FIGNL1 is believed to promote the disassembly of DMC1 during male meiosis.

=== Rad51 ===
During meiosis, the two recombinases, Rad51 and Dmc1, interact with single-stranded DNA to form specialized filaments that are adapted for facilitating recombination between homologous chromosomes. Both Dmc1 and Rad51 have an intrinsic ability to self-aggregate. The presence of Rad51 filaments stabilizes adjacent Dmc1 filaments and conversely Dmc1 stabilizes adjacent Rad51 filaments. A model was proposed in which Dmc1 and Rad51 form separate filaments on the same single stranded DNA and cross-talk between the two recombinases affects their biochemical properties.

During meiosis, even in the absence of Rad51 strand exchange activity, Dmc1 appears to be able to repair all meiotic DNA breaks, and this absence does not affect meiotic crossing over rates.

=== Hop2/Mnd1 ===
Hop2 and Mnd1 associate into a heterodimer which itself has affinity for dsDNA, and to a lesser extent, ssDNA. Hop2/Mnd1 stimulates strand-exchange activity of DMC1 in vitro. The interaction of Hop2/Mnd1 and DMC1 are thought to promote preferential binding of DMC1 to ssDNA and bring homologs into close proximity.

=== SCM5/6 ===
DMC1 interacts with the Structural Maintenance of Chromosomes 5/6 (SMC5/6) complex. SCM5/6 complex inhibits the formation of DNA intermediates and is involved in their resolution. There is evidence that SCM5/6 interacts with and inhibit meiotic localization of DMC1. Rad51 can inhibit this interaction, and this may be its role as an accessory factor during meiotic homologous recombination.

== Clinical significance ==
Mutations in the DMC1 gene are associated with male infertility, due to nonobstructive azoospermia, where the testes produce little to no sperm. In mice, a single amino acid change can prevent crossing over and lead to meiotic arrest through an autosomal dominant mechanism.
