= XRCC2 =

Protein-coding gene in the species Homo sapiens

Identifiers
- Aliases: XRCC2, FANCU, X-ray repair cross complementing 2, SPGF50, POF17
- External IDs: OMIM: 600375; MGI: 1927345; GeneCards: XRCC2

Gene location (Human)
Chr.	Chromosome 7 (human)
Band	7q36.1	Start	152,644,776 bp
Band	7q36.1	End	152,676,141 bp

Gene location (Mouse)
Chr.	Chromosome 5 (mouse)
Band	5|5 B1	Start	25,894,810 bp
Band	5|5 B1	End	25,910,823 bp
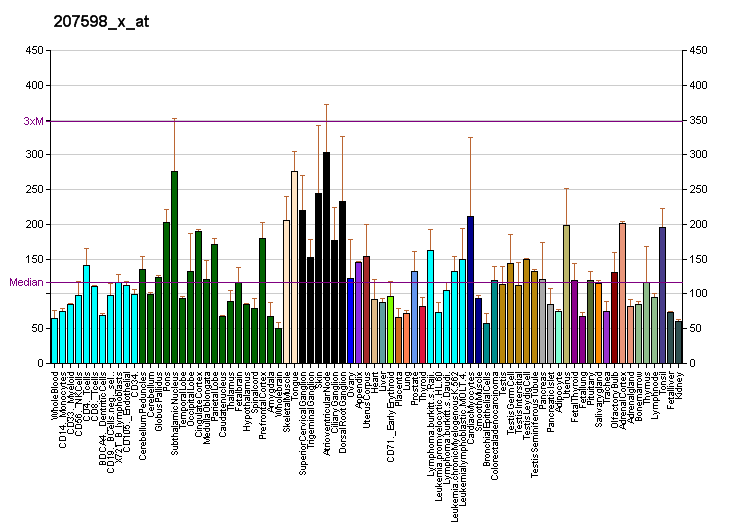
RNA expression pattern
Bgee	Human / Mouse (ortholog); Top expressed in: buccal mucosa cell; tendon of biceps brachii; external globus pallidus; sperm; pylorus; subthalamic nucleus; inferior ganglion of vagus nerve; pars reticulata; cardia; ventral tegmental area / Top expressed in: spermatocyte; cumulus cell; ventricular zone; yolk sac; secondary oocyte; lumbar subsegment of spinal cord; spermatid; epiblast; tail of embryo; primary oocyte; More reference expression data
BioGPS	More reference expression data
Gene ontology
Molecular function	DNA binding; ATP-dependent activity, acting on DNA; DNA strand exchange activity; single-stranded DNA binding; protein binding; four-way junction DNA binding; double-stranded DNA binding; endodeoxyribonuclease activity; ATP binding
Cellular component	cytoplasm; centrosome; replication fork; microtubule organizing center; Rad51B-Rad51C-Rad51D-XRCC2 complex; cytoskeleton; nucleus; nucleoplasm; intracellular membrane-bounded organelle
Biological process	somitogenesis; response to ionizing radiation; strand invasion; negative regulation of neuron apoptotic process; reciprocal meiotic recombination; neurogenesis; DNA recombination; multicellular organism growth; regulation of fibroblast apoptotic process; in utero embryonic development; cellular response to DNA damage stimulus; positive regulation of neurogenesis; mitotic cell cycle; mitotic recombination; response to gamma radiation; DNA repair; response to X-ray; meiotic DNA recombinase assembly; double-strand break repair via homologous recombination; meiosis; centrosome cycle
Sources:Amigo / QuickGO
Orthologs
Databases	NCBI: entry; OMA: entry
Species	Human	Mouse
Entrez	7516	57434
Ensembl	ENSG00000196584	ENSMUSG00000028933
UniProt	O43543	Q9CX47
RefSeq (mRNA)	NM_005431	NM_020570
RefSeq (protein)	NP_005422	NP_065595
Location (UCSC)	Chr 7: 152.64 – 152.68 Mb	Chr 5: 25.89 – 25.91 Mb
PubMed search
- Wikidata
View/Edit Human	View/Edit Mouse

DNA repair protein XRCC2 is a protein that in humans is encoded by the XRCC2 gene.

== Function ==
This gene encodes a member of the RecA/Rad51-related protein family that participates in homologous recombination to maintain chromosome stability and repair DNA damage. This gene is involved in the repair of DNA double-strand breaks by homologous recombination and it functionally complements Chinese hamster irs1, a repair-deficient mutant that exhibits hypersensitivity to a number of different DNA-damaging agents.

The XRCC2 protein is one of five human paralogs of RAD51, including RAD51B (RAD51L1), RAD51C (RAD51L2), RAD51D (RAD51L3), XRCC2 and XRCC3. They each share about 25% amino acid sequence identity with RAD51 and each other.

The RAD51 paralogs are all required for efficient DNA double-strand break repair by homologous recombination and depletion of any paralog results in significant decreases in homologous recombination frequency.

XRCC2 forms a four-part complex with three related paralogs: BCDX2 (RAD51B-RAD51C-RAD51D-XRCC2) while two paralogs form a second complex CX3 (RAD51C-XRCC3). These two complexes act at two different stages of homologous recombinational DNA repair. The BCDX2 complex is responsible for RAD51 recruitment or stabilization at damage sites. The BCDX2 complex appears to act by facilitating the assembly or stability of the RAD51 nucleoprotein filament.

The CX3 complex acts downstream of RAD51 recruitment to damage sites. The CX3 complex was shown to associate with Holliday junction resolvase activity, probably in a role of stabilizing gene conversion tracts.

== Interactions ==
XRCC2 has been shown to interact with RAD51L3, Bloom syndrome protein and RAD51C.

== Epigenetic deficiency in cancer ==
There are two known epigenetic causes of XRCC2 deficiency that appear to increase cancer risk. These are methylation of the XRCC2 promoter and epigenetic repression of XRCC2 by over-expression of EZH2 protein.

The XRCC2 gene was found to be hypermethylated in the promoter region in 52 of 54 cases of cervical cancer. Promoter hypermethylation reduces gene expression, and thus would reduce the tumor suppressing homologous recombinational repair otherwise supported by XRCC2.

Increased expression of EZH2 leads to epigenetic repression of RAD51 paralogs, including XRCC2, and thus reduces homologous recombinational repair. This reduction was proposed to be a cause of breast cancer. EZH2 is the catalytic subunit of Polycomb Repressor Complex 2 (PRC2) which catalyzes methylation of histone H3 at lysine 27 (H3K27me) and mediates gene silencing of target genes via local chromatin reorganization. EZH2 protein is up-regulated in numerous cancers. EZH2 mRNA is up-regulated, on average, 7.5-fold in breast cancer, and between 40% and 75% of breast cancers have over-expressed EZH2 protein.
