= RAD51C =

Protein-coding gene in the species Homo sapiens

Identifiers
- Aliases: RAD51C, BROVCA3, FANCO, R51H3, RAD51L2, RAD51 paralog C
- External IDs: OMIM: 602774; MGI: 2150020; GeneCards: RAD51C

Gene location (Human)
Chr.	Chromosome 17 (human)
Band	17q22	Start	58,692,573 bp
Band	17q22	End	58,735,611 bp

Gene location (Mouse)
Chr.	Chromosome 11 (mouse)
Band	11 C|11 52.08 cM	Start	87,267,471 bp
Band	11 C|11 52.08 cM	End	87,295,780 bp
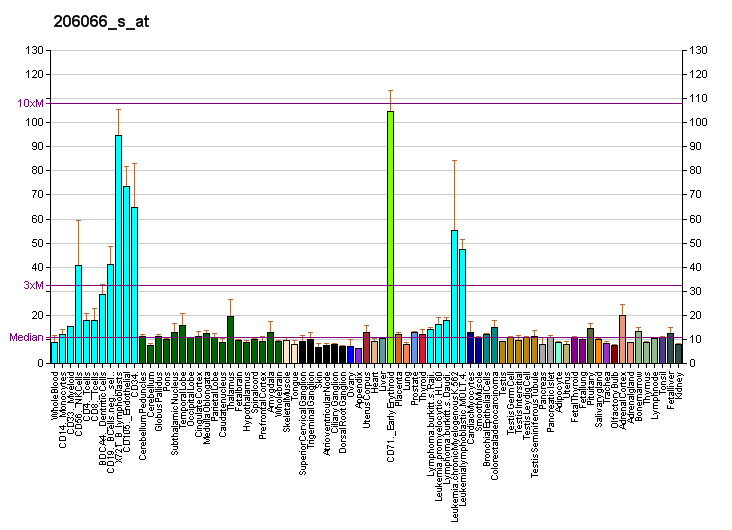

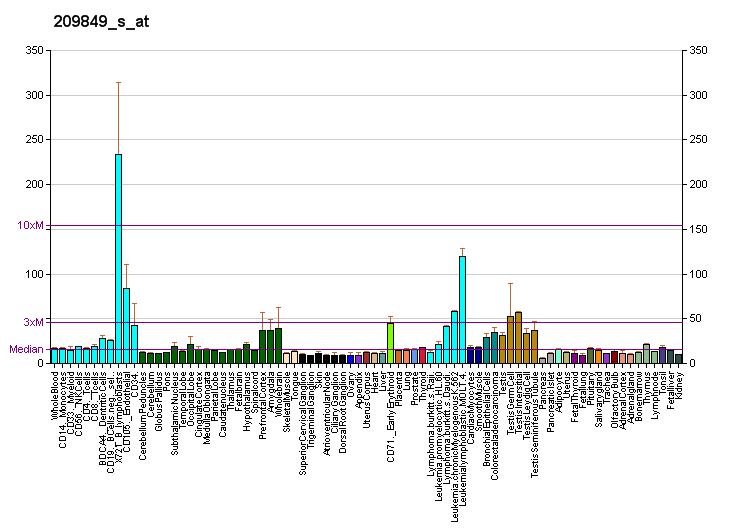
RNA expression pattern
Bgee	Human / Mouse (ortholog); Top expressed in: gonad; right testis; left testis; testicle; right frontal lobe; ventricular zone; Brodmann area 9; oocyte; prefrontal cortex; right auricle of heart / Top expressed in: secondary oocyte; zygote; primary oocyte; seminiferous tubule; endocardial cushion; spermatocyte; ventricular zone; neural layer of retina; tail of embryo; atrioventricular valve; More reference expression data
BioGPS	More reference expression data
Gene ontology
Molecular function	crossover junction endodeoxyribonuclease activity; DNA binding; nucleotide binding; ATP-dependent activity, acting on DNA; DNA strand exchange activity; single-stranded DNA binding; protein binding; four-way junction DNA binding; double-stranded DNA binding; ATP binding
Cellular component	cytoplasm; replication fork; Rad51C-XRCC3 complex; mitochondrion; perinuclear region of cytoplasm; Rad51B-Rad51C-Rad51D-XRCC2 complex; Holliday junction resolvase complex; nucleus; cytosol; cell junction; intracellular membrane-bounded organelle; nucleoplasm
Biological process	strand invasion; response to ionizing radiation; reciprocal meiotic recombination; DNA recombination; male meiosis I; blood coagulation; female meiosis sister chromatid cohesion; sister chromatid cohesion; cellular response to DNA damage stimulus; telomere maintenance via recombination; spermatogenesis; positive regulation of G2/M transition of mitotic cell cycle; mitotic recombination; DNA repair; double-strand break repair via homologous recombination; meiotic DNA recombinase assembly
Sources:Amigo / QuickGO
Orthologs
Databases	NCBI: entry; OMA: entry
Species	Human	Mouse
Entrez	5889	114714
Ensembl	ENSG00000108384	ENSMUSG00000007646
UniProt	O43502	Q924H5
RefSeq (mRNA)	NM_002876; NM_058216	NM_001291440; NM_053269
RefSeq (protein)	NP_002867; NP_478123	NP_001278369; NP_444499
Location (UCSC)	Chr 17: 58.69 – 58.74 Mb	Chr 11: 87.27 – 87.3 Mb
PubMed search
- Wikidata
View/Edit Human	View/Edit Mouse

RAD51 homolog C (S. cerevisiae), also known as RAD51C, is a protein which in humans is encoded by the RAD51C gene.

== Function ==
The RAD51C protein is one of five paralogs of RAD51, including RAD51B (RAD51L1), RAD51C (RAD51L2), RAD51D (RAD51L3), XRCC2 and XRCC3. They each share about 25% amino acid sequence identity with RAD51 and each other.

The RAD51 paralogs are all required for efficient DNA double-strand break repair by homologous recombination and depletion of any paralog results in significant decreases in homologous recombination frequency.

RAD51C forms two distinct complexes with other related paralogs: BCDX2 (RAD51B-RAD51C-RAD51D-XRCC2) and CX3 (RAD51C-XRCC3). These two complexes act at two different stages of homologous recombinational DNA repair. The BCDX2 complex is responsible for RAD51 recruitment or stabilization at damage sites. The BCDX2 complex appears to act by facilitating the assembly or stability of the RAD51 nucleoprotein filament.

The CX3 complex acts downstream of RAD51 recruitment to damage sites. The CX3 complex was shown to associate with Holliday junction resolvase activity, probably in a role of stabilizing gene conversion tracts.

The RAD51C gene of rice has an essential role in meiosis in both male and female gametocytes. RAD51C is also required for repair of DNA damage in rice somatic cells.

The RAD51C gene is one of genes four localized to a region of chromosome 17q23 where amplification occurs frequently in breast tumors. Overexpression of the four genes during amplification has been observed and suggests a possible role in tumor progression. Alternative splicing has been observed for this gene and two variants encoding different isoforms have been identified.

== Clinical significance ==
A characteristic of many cancer cells is that parts of some genes contained within these cells have been recombined with other genes. One such gene fusion that has been identified in a MCF-7 breast cancer cell line is a chimera between the RAD51C and ATXN7 genes. Since the RAD51C protein is involved in repairing double strand chromosome breaks, this chromosomal rearrangement could be responsible for the other rearrangements.

== Mutation, splicing, and epigenetic deficiency in cancer ==
RAD51C mutation increases the risk for breast and ovarian cancer, and was first established as a human cancer susceptibility gene in 2010. Carriers of an RAD51C mutation had a 5.2-fold increased risk of ovarian cancer, indicating that RAD51C is a moderate ovarian cancer susceptibility gene. A pathogenic mutation of RAD51C was present in approximately 1% to 3% of unselected ovarian cancers, and among mutation carriers, the lifetime risk of ovarian cancer was approximately 10-15%.

In addition, there are three other causes of RAD51C deficiency that also appear to increase cancer risk. These are alternative splicing, promoter methylation and repression by over-expression of EZH2.

Three alternatively spliced RAD51C transcripts were identified in colorectal cancers. Variant 1 is joined from the 3' end of exon-6 to the 5' end of exon-8, variant 2 is joined at the 3' end of exon-5 to the 5' end of exon-8, and variant 3 is joined from the 3' end of exon-6 to the 5' end of exon-9. Presence and mRNA expression of variant 1 RAD51C was found in 47% of colorectal cancers. Variant 1 mRNA was expressed about 5-fold more frequently in colorectal tumors than in non-tumor tissues, and when present, was expressed 8-fold more frequently than wild-type RAD51C mRNA. The authors concluded that variant 1 mRNA was associated with the malignant phenotype of colorectal cancers

In the case of gastric cancer, reduced expression of RAD51C was found in about 40% to 50% of tumors, and almost all tumors with reduced RAD51C expression had methylation of the RAD51C promoter. On the other hand, methylation of the RAD51C promoter was only found in about 1.5% of ovarian cancer cases.

EZH2 protein is up-regulated in numerous cancers. EZH2 mRNA is up-regulated, on average, 7.5-fold in breast cancer, and between 40% and 75% of breast cancers have over-expressed EZH2 protein. EZH2 is the catalytic subunit of polycomb repressive complex 2 (PRC2) which catalyzes methylation of histone H3 at lysine 27 (H3K27me) and mediates epigenetic gene silencing of target genes via local chromatin reorganization. EZH2 targets RAD51C, reducing RAD51C mRNA and protein expression (and also represses other RAD51 paralogs RAD51B, RAD51D, XRCC2 and XRCC3). Increased expression of EZH2, leading to repression of RAD51 paralogs and consequent reduced homologous recombinational repair, was proposed as a cause of breast cancer.

== Interactions ==
RAD51C has been shown to interact with:

- RAD51L1,
- RAD51L3, and
- XRCC2, and
- XRCC3.
