= RAD51D =

Protein-coding gene in the species Homo sapiens

Identifiers
- Aliases: RAD51D, BROVCA4, R51H3, RAD51L3, TRAD, RAD51 paralog D
- External IDs: OMIM: 602954; MGI: 1261809; GeneCards: RAD51D
Available structures
PDB	Ortholog search: PDBe RCSB
PDB	List of PDB id codes 2KZ3

Gene location (Human)
Chr.	Chromosome 17 (human)
Band	17q12	Start	35,092,221 bp
Band	17q12	End	35,121,522 bp

Gene location (Mouse)
Chr.	Chromosome 11 (mouse)
Band	11 C|11 50.3 cM	Start	82,767,260 bp
Band	11 C|11 50.3 cM	End	82,781,440 bp
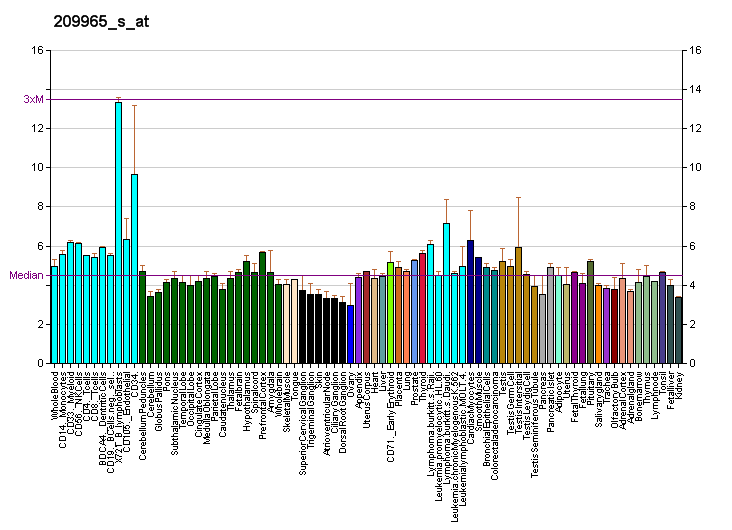

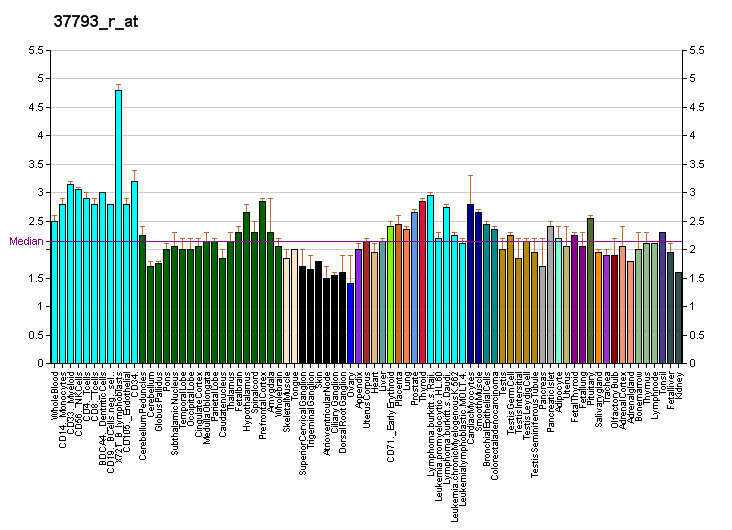
RNA expression pattern
Bgee	Human / Mouse (ortholog); Top expressed in: sperm; oocyte; right testis; left testis; stromal cell of endometrium; ganglionic eminence; prefrontal cortex; epithelium of colon; right frontal lobe; granulocyte / Top expressed in: granulocyte; right kidney; proximal tubule; zygote; secondary oocyte; primary oocyte; Rostral migratory stream; embryo; dentate gyrus of hippocampal formation granule cell; mesenteric lymph nodes; More reference expression data
BioGPS	More reference expression data
Gene ontology
Molecular function	DNA binding; nucleotide binding; ATP-dependent activity, acting on DNA; DNA strand exchange activity; single-stranded DNA binding; protein binding; four-way junction DNA binding; gamma-tubulin binding; double-stranded DNA binding; endodeoxyribonuclease activity; ATP binding
Cellular component	cytoplasm; centrosome; replication fork; chromosome; microtubule organizing center; telomere; Rad51B-Rad51C-Rad51D-XRCC2 complex; cytoskeleton; nucleus; nucleoplasm
Biological process	strand invasion; response to ionizing radiation; nucleotide-excision repair; reciprocal meiotic recombination; DNA recombination; interstrand cross-link repair; chromosome organization; regulation of cell cycle; cellular response to DNA damage stimulus; mitotic recombination; telomere maintenance; DNA repair; meiotic DNA recombinase assembly; double-strand break repair via homologous recombination
Sources:Amigo / QuickGO
Orthologs
Databases	NCBI: entry; OMA: entry
Species	Human	Mouse
Entrez	5892	19364
Ensembl	ENSG00000185379	ENSMUSG00000018841
UniProt	O75771	O55230
RefSeq (mRNA)	NM_001142571; NM_002878; NM_133627; NM_133628; NM_133629 NM_133630	NM_001277938; NM_001277939; NM_001277941; NM_001277942; NM_011235
RefSeq (protein)	NP_001136043; NP_002869; NP_598332	NP_001264867; NP_001264868; NP_001264870; NP_001264871; NP_035365
Location (UCSC)	Chr 17: 35.09 – 35.12 Mb	Chr 11: 82.77 – 82.78 Mb
PubMed search
- Wikidata
View/Edit Human	View/Edit Mouse

DNA repair protein RAD51 homolog 4 is a protein that in humans is encoded by the RAD51D gene (previously RAD51L3).

== Function ==
The protein encoded by this gene is a member of the RAD51 protein family. RAD51 family members are highly similar to bacterial RecA and Saccharomyces cerevisiae Rad51, which are known to be involved in the homologous recombination and repair of DNA. This protein forms a complex with several other members of the RAD51 family, including RAD51L1, RAD51L2, and XRCC2. The protein complex formed with this protein has been shown to catalyze homologous pairing between single- and double-stranded DNA, and is thought to play a role in the early stage of recombinant DNA repair. Several alternatively spliced transcript variants of this gene have been described, but the biological validity of some of them has not been determined.

== Interactions ==
RAD51L3 has been shown to interact with:

- Bloom syndrome protein,
- RAD51C, and
- XRCC2.
