= RAD51B =

Protein-coding gene in humans

Identifiers
- Aliases: RAD51B, R51H2, RAD51L1, REC2, RAD51 paralog B
- External IDs: OMIM: 602948; MGI: 1099436; GeneCards: RAD51B

Gene location (Human)
Chr.	Chromosome 14 (human)
Band	14q24.1	Start	67,819,779 bp
Band	14q24.1	End	68,730,218 bp

Gene location (Mouse)
Chr.	Chromosome 12 (mouse)
Band	12|12 C3	Start	79,297,282 bp
Band	12|12 C3	End	79,814,690 bp
RNA expression pattern
Bgee	Human / Mouse (ortholog); Top expressed in: sural nerve; buccal mucosa cell; testicle; secondary oocyte; body of uterus; ventricular zone; Achilles tendon; gallbladder; corpus callosum; epithelium of colon / Top expressed in: blastocyst; zygote; spermatid; embryo; morula; cumulus cell; embryo; ventricular zone; tail of embryo; uterus; More reference expression data
BioGPS	n/a
Gene ontology
Molecular function	DNA binding; nucleotide binding; ATP-dependent activity, acting on DNA; DNA strand exchange activity; single-stranded DNA binding; protein binding; four-way junction DNA binding; double-stranded DNA binding; endodeoxyribonuclease activity; ATP binding
Cellular component	replication fork; nucleoplasm; Rad51B-Rad51C-Rad51D-XRCC2 complex; nucleus
Biological process	strand invasion; response to ionizing radiation; reciprocal meiotic recombination; DNA recombination; blood coagulation; cellular response to DNA damage stimulus; positive regulation of G2/M transition of mitotic cell cycle; mitotic recombination; DNA repair; meiotic DNA recombinase assembly; double-strand break repair via homologous recombination
Sources:Amigo / QuickGO
Orthologs
Databases	NCBI: entry; OMA: entry
Species	Human	Mouse
Entrez	5890	19363
Ensembl	ENSG00000182185	ENSMUSG00000059060
UniProt	O15315	O35719
RefSeq (mRNA)	NM_002877; NM_133509; NM_133510; NM_001321809; NM_001321810 NM_001321812; NM_001321814; NM_001321815; NM_001321817; NM_001321818; NM_001321819; NM_001321821	NM_001252562; NM_009014
RefSeq (protein)	NP_001308738; NP_001308739; NP_001308741; NP_001308743; NP_001308744 NP_001308746; NP_001308747; NP_001308748; NP_001308750; NP_002868; NP_598193; NP_598194	NP_001239491; NP_033040
Location (UCSC)	Chr 14: 67.82 – 68.73 Mb	Chr 12: 79.3 – 79.81 Mb
PubMed search
- Wikidata
View/Edit Human	View/Edit Mouse

DNA repair protein RAD51 homolog 2 is a protein that in humans is encoded by the RAD51B gene (previously RAD51L1).

== Function ==
The protein encoded by this gene is a member of the RAD51 protein family. RAD51 family members are evolutionarily conserved proteins essential for DNA repair by homologous recombination. This protein has been shown to form a stable heterodimer with the family member RAD51C, which further interacts with the other family members, such as RAD51, XRCC2, and XRCC3. Overexpression of this gene was found to cause cell cycle G1 delay and cell apoptosis, which suggested a role of this protein in sensing DNA damage. At least three alternatively spliced transcript variants encoding distinct isoforms have been observed.

RAD51L1 is employed in the repair of DNA double-strand breaks. Different polymorphisms of the RAD51L1 gene modulate sensitivity to gamma rays and also glioma risk.

== Interactions ==
RAD51L1 has been shown to interact with RAD51C.
