= RecQ helicase =

Class of enzymes

Bloom syndrome

Identifiers
- Symbol: BLM
- NCBI gene: 641
- HGNC: 1058
- OMIM: 604610
- RefSeq: NM_000057
- UniProt: P54132

Other data
- Locus: Chr. 15
Search for
- Structures: Swiss-model
- Domains: InterPro

RecQ protein-like 4

Identifiers
- Symbol: RECQL4
- NCBI gene: 9401
- HGNC: 9949
- OMIM: 603780
- RefSeq: NM_004260
- UniProt: O94761

Other data
- Locus: Chr. 8 q24.3
Search for
- Structures: Swiss-model
- Domains: InterPro

RecQ protein-like 5

Identifiers
- Symbol: RECQL5
- NCBI gene: 9400
- HGNC: 9950
- OMIM: 603781
- RefSeq: NM_004259
- UniProt: O94762

Other data
- Locus: Chr. 17 q25
Search for
- Structures: Swiss-model
- Domains: InterPro

RMI1, RecQ mediated genome instability 1

Identifiers
- Symbol: RMI1
- Alt. symbols: C9orf76
- NCBI gene: 80010
- HGNC: 25764
- OMIM: 610404
- RefSeq: NM_024945
- UniProt: Q9H9A7

Other data
- Locus: Chr. 9 q22.1
Search for
- Structures: Swiss-model
- Domains: InterPro

Werner syndrome

Identifiers
- Symbol: WRN
- NCBI gene: 7486
- HGNC: 12791
- OMIM: 604611
- RefSeq: NM_000553
- UniProt: Q14191

Other data
- Locus: Chr. 8 p
Search for
- Structures: Swiss-model
- Domains: InterPro

RecQ helicase is a family of helicase enzymes initially found in Escherichia coli that has been shown to be important in genome maintenance. They function through catalyzing the reaction ATP + H_{2}O → ADP + P and thus driving the unwinding of paired DNA and translocating in the 3' to 5' direction. These enzymes can also drive the reaction NTP + H_{2}O → NDP + P to drive the unwinding of either DNA or RNA.

== Function ==
In prokaryotes RecQ is necessary for plasmid recombination and DNA repair from UV-light, free radicals, and alkylating agents. This protein can also reverse damage from replication errors. In eukaryotes, replication does not proceed normally in the absence of RecQ proteins, which also function in aging, silencing, recombination and DNA repair.

== Structure ==
RecQ family members share three regions of conserved protein sequence referred to as the:

- N-terminal – Helicase
- middle – RecQ-conserved (RecQ-Ct) and
- C-terminal – Helicase-and-RNase-D C-terminal (HRDC) domains.

The removal of the N-terminal residues (Helicase and, RecQ-Ct domains) impairs both helicase and ATPase activity but has no effect on the binding ability of RecQ implying that the N-terminus functions as the catalytic end. Truncations of the C-terminus (HRDC domain) compromise the binding ability of RecQ but not the catalytic function. The importance of RecQ in cellular functions is exemplified by human diseases, which all lead to genomic instability and a predisposition to cancer.

== Clinical significance ==
There are at least five human RecQ genes; and mutations in three human RecQ genes are implicated in heritable human diseases: WRN gene in Werner syndrome (WS), BLM gene in Bloom syndrome (BS), and RECQL4 in Rothmund–Thomson syndrome. These syndromes are characterized by premature aging, and can give rise to the diseases of cancer, type 2 diabetes, osteoporosis, and atherosclerosis, which are commonly found in old age. These diseases are associated with high incidence of chromosomal abnormalities, including chromosome breaks, complex rearrangements, deletions and translocations, site specific mutations, and in particular sister chromatid exchanges (more common in BS) that are believed to be caused by a high level of somatic recombination.

== Mechanism ==
The proper function of RecQ helicases requires the specific interaction with topoisomerase III (Top 3). Top 3 changes the topological status of DNA by binding and cleaving single stranded DNA and passing either a single stranded or a double stranded DNA segment through the transient break and finally re-ligating the break. The interaction of RecQ helicase with topoisomerase III at the N-terminal region is involved in the suppression of spontaneous and damage induced recombination and the absence of this interaction results in a lethal or very severe phenotype. The emerging picture clearly is that RecQ helicases in concert with Top 3 are involved in maintaining genomic stability and integrity by controlling recombination events, and repairing DNA damage in the G2-phase of the cell cycle. The importance of RecQ for genomic integrity is exemplified by the diseases that arise as a consequence of mutations or malfunctions in RecQ helicases; thus it is crucial that RecQ is present and functional to ensure proper human growth and development.

=== WRN helicase ===
The Werner syndrome ATP-dependent helicase (WRN helicase) is unusual among RecQ DNA family helicases in having an additional exonuclease activity. WRN interacts with DNA-PKcs and the Ku protein complex. This observation, combined with evidence that WRN deficient cells produce extensive deletions at sites of joining of non-homologous DNA ends, suggests a role for WRN protein in the DNA repair process of non-homologous end joining (NHEJ). WRN also physically interacts with the major NHEJ factor X4L4 (XRCC4-DNA ligase 4 complex). X4L4 stimulates WRN exonuclease activity that likely facilitates DNA end processing prior to final ligation by X4L4.

WRN also appears to play a role in resolving recombination intermediate structures during homologous recombinational repair (HRR) of DNA double-strand breaks.

WRN participates in a complex with RAD51, RAD54, RAD54B and ATR proteins in carrying out the recombination step during inter-strand DNA cross-link repair.

Evidence was presented that WRN plays a direct role in the repair of methylation induced DNA damage. The process likely involves the helicase and exonuclease activities of WRN that operate together with DNA polymerase beta in long patch base excision repair.

WRN was found to have a specific role in preventing or repairing DNA damages resulting from chronic oxidative stress, particularly in slowly replicating cells. This finding suggested that WRN may be important in dealing with oxidative DNA damages that underlie normal aging (see DNA damage theory of aging).

=== BLM helicase ===
Cells from humans with Bloom syndrome are sensitive to DNA damaging agents such as UV and methyl methanesulfonate indicating deficient DNA repair capability.

The budding yeast Saccharomyces cerevisiae encodes an ortholog of the Bloom syndrome (BLM) protein that is designated Sgs1 (Slow growth suppressor 1). Sgs1(BLM) is a helicase that functions in homologous recombinational repair of DNA double-strand breaks. The Sgs1(BLM) helicase appears to be a central regulator of most of the recombination events that occur during S. cerevisiae meiosis. During normal meiosis Sgs1(BLM) is responsible for directing recombination towards the alternate formation of either early non-crossovers or Holliday junction joint molecules, the latter being subsequently resolved as crossovers.

In the plant Arabidopsis thaliana, homologs of the Sgs1(BLM) helicase act as major barriers to meiotic crossover formation. These helicases are thought to displace the invading strand allowing its annealing with the other 3'overhang end of the double-strand break, leading to non-crossover recombinant formation by a process called synthesis-dependent strand annealing (SDSA) (see Wikipedia article "Genetic recombination"). It is estimated that only about 5% of double-strand breaks are repaired by crossover recombination. Sequela-Arnaud et al. suggested that crossover numbers are restricted because of the long-term costs of crossover recombination, that is, the breaking up of favorable genetic combinations of alleles built up by past natural selection.

=== RECQL4 helicase ===
In humans, individuals with Rothmund–Thomson syndrome, and carrying the RECQL4 germline mutation, have several clinical features of accelerated aging. These features include atrophic skin and pigment changes, alopecia, osteopenia, cataracts and an increased incidence of cancer. RECQL4 mutant mice also show features of accelerated aging.

RECQL4 has a crucial role in DNA end resection that is the initial step required for homologous recombination (HR)-dependent double-strand break repair. When RECQL4 is depleted, HR-mediated repair and 5' end resection are severely reduced in vivo. RECQL4 also appears to be necessary for other forms of DNA repair including non-homologous end joining, nucleotide excision repair and base excision repair. The association of deficient RECQL4 mediated DNA repair with accelerated aging is consistent with the DNA damage theory of aging.

== See also ==
- Bloom syndrome
