= Rothmund =

Rothmund is a German surname, derived from the Germanic male given name Hrodmund, from hrod meaning "fame" (found in names such as Robert, Roderick, Rudolph, Roland Rodney, and Roger) and mund meaning "protection" or "protector" (found in names such as Edmund, Cynemund, and Raymond). It may refer to:

- August von Rothmund (1830–1906), German ophthalmologist; son of Franz Christoph von Rothmund
- Franz Christoph von Rothmund (1801–1891), German surgeon; father of August von Rothmund
- Toni Rothmund (1877–1956), German writer and journalist

== See also ==
- Rothmund–Thomson syndrome (RTS), an abnormal condition of the skin
