= RAPADILINO syndrome =

Rapadilino syndrome
- Other names: Radial and patellar aplasia, Radial and patellar hypoplasia
- Rapadilino syndrome has an autosomal recessive pattern of inheritance.
- Specialty: Musculoskeletal
- Symptoms: Underdevelopment or absences of the bones in the forearms, thumbs, and kneecaps, cleft palate or high-arched, palate, diarrhea, and short stature.
- Usual onset: Infancy
- Duration: Lifelong
- Causes: Mutations in the RECQL4 gene
- Frequency: Less than 1,000 known cases in the United States

RAPADILINO syndrome is an autosomal recessive disorder characterized by:

- RA: radial ray defect
- PA: patellar aplasia, arched or cleft palate
- DI: diarrhea, dislocated joints
- LI: little (short stature), limb malformation
- NO: slender nose, normal intelligence

It is more prevalent in Finland than elsewhere in the world. It has been associated with the gene RECQL4. This is also associated with Rothmund–Thomson syndrome and Baller–Gerold syndrome.

== Signs and symptoms ==
Most people with RAPADILINO syndrome have underdeveloped or absent bones in the forearms and thumbs. Kneecaps may be underdeveloped or absent. Other characteristics include a cleft or high-arched palate, a long, narrow nose, and dislocated joints.

Many infants with RAPADILINO suffer feeding difficulties, as well as diarrhea and vomiting. A combination of poor bone development and nutritional deficiencies can cause slow growth and short stature.

Some RAPADILINO syndrome patients have harmless light brown patches of skin that resemble café-au-lait spots. Patients with RAPADILINO syndrome are more likely to develop osteosarcoma or lymphoma. In those with RAPADILINO syndrome, osteosarcoma typically develops during childhood or adolescence, whereas lymphoma develops in early adulthood.

== Cause ==
RAPADILINO syndrome is caused by RECQL4 gene mutations. The RECQL4 gene gives instructions to produce a member of a protein family known as RecQ helicases. Helicases are enzymes that temporarily bind to DNA and unwind the DNA molecule's two spiral strands. This unwinding is needed for DNA replication to prepare for cell division and for mending damaged DNA. The RECQL4 protein is involved in DNA replication and repair as well as the stability of genetic information in cells.

The most frequent RECQL4 gene mutation linked to RAPADILINO syndrome causes the RECQL4 protein to be misassembled. This genetic mutation causes the formation of a protein that lacks exon 7, therefore cannot function as a helicase. In the lack of helicase function, normal DNA replication and repair may be impaired resulting in widespread genetic damage. Although it is unknown how RECQL4 gene mutations produce RAPADILINO syndrome's specific symptoms, these changes may result in the accumulation of DNA errors and cell death.
