= RMI1 =

Protein-coding gene in the species Homo sapiens

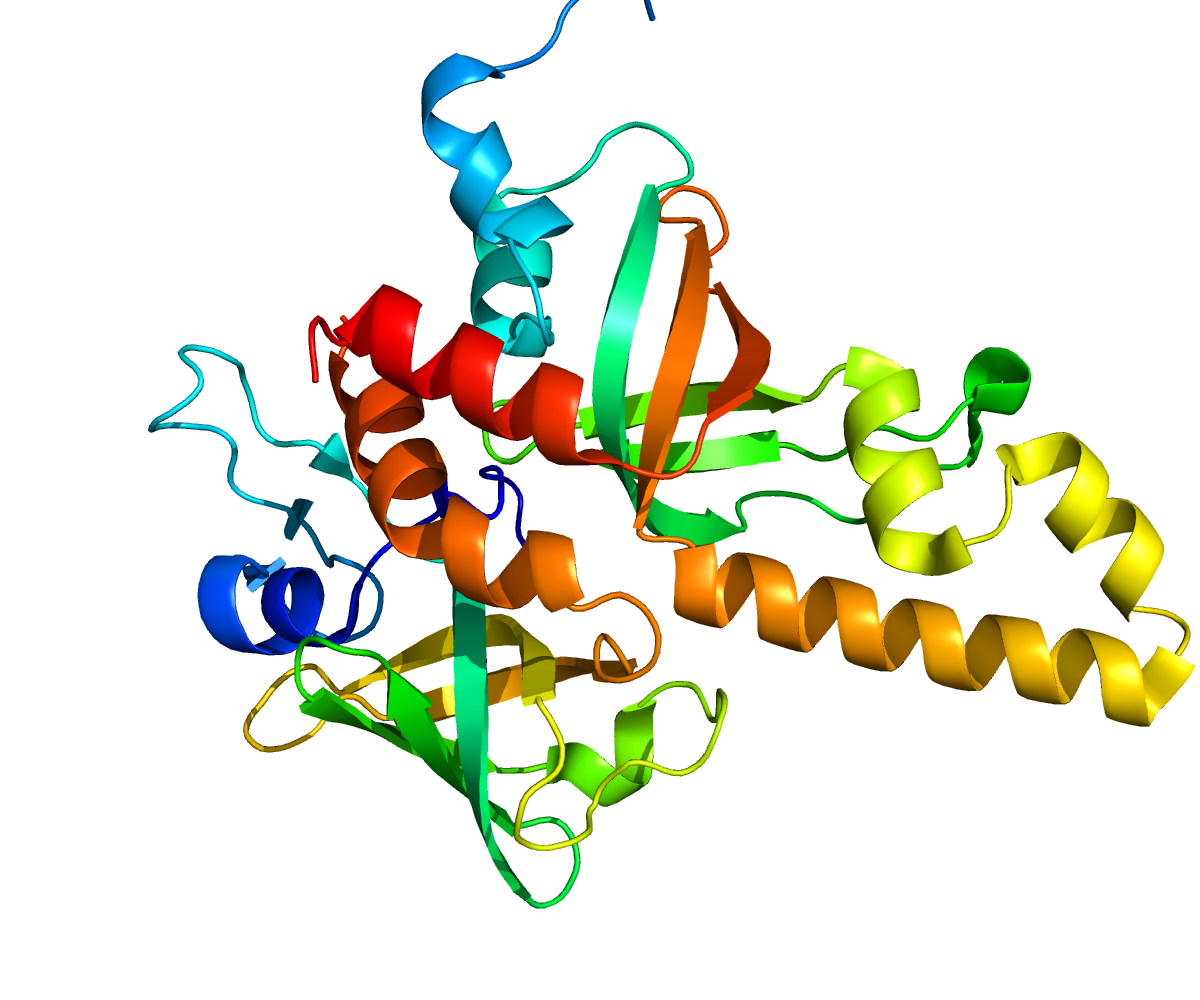
Available structures
PDB	Ortholog search: PDBe RCSB
PDB	List of PDB id codes 3MXN, 3NBH, 3NBI, 4CGY, 4CHT, 4DAY

Identifiers
- Aliases: RMI1, BLAP75, C9orf76, FAAP75, RecQ mediated genome instability 1
- External IDs: OMIM: 610404; MGI: 1921636; HomoloGene: 41601; GeneCards: RMI1; OMA:RMI1 - orthologs

Gene location (Human)
Chr.	Chromosome 9 (human)
Band	9q21.32	Start	83,980,798 bp
Band	9q21.32	End	84,004,074 bp

Gene location (Mouse)
Chr.	Chromosome 13 (mouse)
Band	13|13 B1	Start	58,550,062 bp
Band	13|13 B1	End	58,558,962 bp
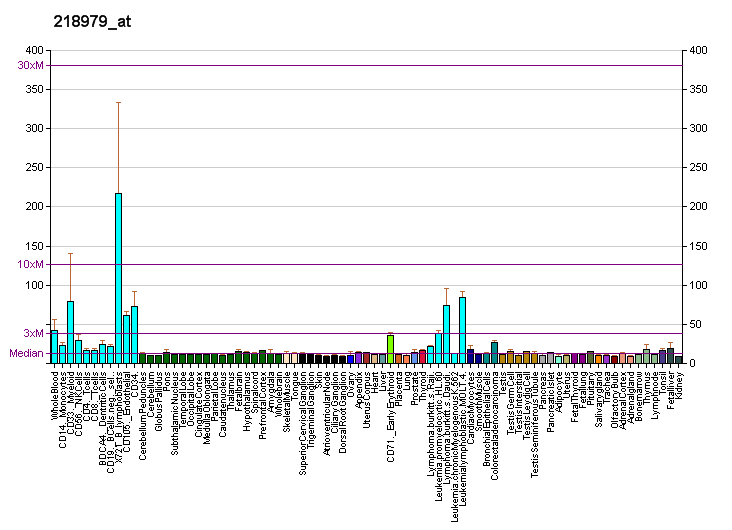
RNA expression pattern
Bgee	Human / Mouse (ortholog); Top expressed in: oocyte; secondary oocyte; Epithelium of choroid plexus; gonad; bronchial epithelial cell; ventricular zone; embryo; ganglionic eminence; testicle; retinal pigment epithelium / Top expressed in: zygote; secondary oocyte; spermatocyte; Rostral migratory stream; spermatid; genital tubercle; tail of embryo; hand; primary oocyte; otolith organ; More reference expression data
BioGPS	More reference expression data
Gene ontology
Molecular function	nucleotide binding; protein binding
Cellular component	nucleus; nucleoplasm; nuclear body; RecQ family helicase-topoisomerase III complex
Biological process	DNA replication; response to dietary excess; reduction of food intake in response to dietary excess; response to glucose; multicellular organism growth; glucose homeostasis; resolution of meiotic recombination intermediates; double-strand break repair via homologous recombination; regulation of signal transduction by p53 class mediator
Sources:Amigo / QuickGO
Orthologs
Species	Human	Mouse
Entrez	80010	74386
Ensembl	ENSG00000178966	ENSMUSG00000035367
UniProt	Q9H9A7	Q9D4G9
RefSeq (mRNA)	NM_024945; NM_001358291; NM_001358292; NM_001358293; NM_001358294	NM_001168248; NM_028904
RefSeq (protein)	NP_079221; NP_001345220; NP_001345221; NP_001345222; NP_001345223	NP_001161720; NP_083180
Location (UCSC)	Chr 9: 83.98 – 84 Mb	Chr 13: 58.55 – 58.56 Mb
PubMed search
- Wikidata
View/Edit Human	View/Edit Mouse

RecQ-mediated genome instability protein 1 is a protein that in humans is encoded by the RMI1 gene.

== Genetic disorders ==
Mutations in RMI1 are associated with Bloom-Syndrome like disorder. Two patients, both with microcephalic dwarfism came from the same family. They carried identical heterozygous mutations: [1255_1259del][Lys419LeufsTer5].

== Function ==
RMI1 protein is a component of the Bloom Syndrome Complex. RMI1 protein is made up of 2 OB (oligonucleotide binding) domains. OB1 binds to Topoisomerase III alpha, while OB2 binds to RMI2 within the Bloom Syndrome complex, and FANCM of the Fanconi Anaemia pathway.

An insert within OB1 domain of RMI1 inserts into the catalytic centre of Topoisomerase III alpha, and is necessary for the optimal activity of this enzyme during cellular DNA repair and homologous recombination.

== Meiosis ==
During meiosis in budding yeast Saccharomyces cerevisiae, TOP3 (a type I topoisomerase) and its accessory factor RMI1 form a heterodimer that functions to allow passage of one DNA single strand through another. The TOP3-RMI1 heterodimer associates with Sgs1 (Bloom helicase ortholog) to form a complex that catalyzes dissolution of double Holliday junctions. Furthermore, the TOP3-RMI1 heterodimer participates in all meiotic recombination functions associated with Sgs1, most significantly as an early recombination intermediate chaperone, promoting regulated crossover and non-crossover recombination and preventing accumulation of aberrant recombination intermediates. In particular, the TOP3-RMI1–SGS1 complex promotes early formation of non-crossover recombinants during meiosis.
