= Sheryl Grossman =

Sheryl Grossman (December 30, 1975,-March 28, 2022) was a disability rights activist.

Grossman had Bloom Syndrome, is a rare autosomal recessive genetic disorder characterized by short stature, predisposition to the development of cancer, and genomic instability.

== Early life and education ==
Grossman was born in Chicago. At age 14, her parents told her she that she had Bloom Syndrome.

She attended Homewood-Flossmoor High School and Washington University in St. Louis (AB and MA).

Grossman moved to Baltimore at age 17 to receive treatment at Johns Hopkins Hospital.

== Activism ==
Grossman worked to educate doctors about Bloom's syndrome. In 1996, Grossman founded the organization Bloom's Connect, the only support organization for people with Bloom's Syndrome.

She advocated for disability rights including access to education, housing and employment. In honor of her work in rare disease awareness, she received the 2020 RareVoice Award.

== Death and legacy ==
Grossman died of cancer in 2022. She was 46.
