= Synthesis-dependent strand annealing =

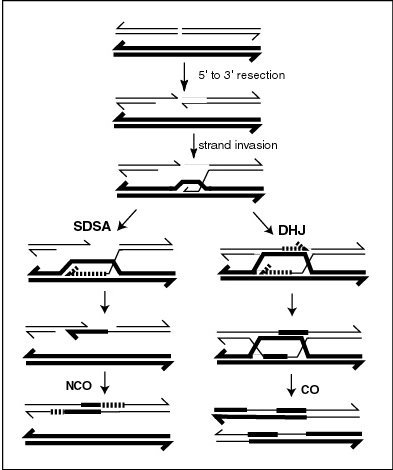
A current model of meiotic recombination, initiated by a double-strand break or gap, followed by pairing with an homologous chromosome and strand invasion to initiate the recombinational repair process. Repair of the gap can lead to crossover (CO) or non-crossover (NCO) of the flanking regions. CO recombination is thought to occur by the Double Holliday Junction (DHJ) model, illustrated on the right, above. NCO recombinants are thought to occur primarily by the Synthesis Dependent Strand Annealing (SDSA) model, illustrated on the left, above. Most recombination events appear to be the SDSA type.

Synthesis-dependent strand annealing (SDSA) is a major mechanism of homology-directed repair of DNA double-strand breaks (DSBs). Although many of the features of SDSA were first suggested in 1976, the double-Holliday junction model proposed in 1983 was favored by many researchers. In 1994, studies of double-strand gap repair in Drosophila were found to be incompatible with the double-Holliday junction model, leading researchers to propose a model they called synthesis-dependent strand annealing. Subsequent studies of meiotic recombination in S. cerevisiae found that non-crossover products appear earlier than double-Holliday junctions or crossover products, challenging the previous notion that both crossover and non-crossover products are produced by double-Holliday junctions and leading the authors to propose that non-crossover products are generated through SDSA.

In the accompanying Figure, the first step labeled “5’ to 3’ resection” shows the formation of a 3’ ended single DNA strand that in the next step invades a homologous DNA duplex. RNA polymerase III is reported to catalyze formation of a transient RNA-DNA hybrid at double-strand breaks as an essential intermediate step in the repair of the breaks by homologous recombination. Formation of the RNA-DNA hybrid would protect the invading single-stranded DNA from degradation. After the transient RNA-DNA hybrid intermediate is formed the RNA strand is replaced by the Rad51 protein which catalyzes the subsequent stage of strand invasion.

In the SDSA model, repair of double-stranded breaks occurs without the formation of a double Holliday junction, so that the two processes of homologous recombination are identical until just after D-loop formation. In yeast, the D-loop is formed by strand invasion with the help of proteins Rad51 and Rad52, and is then acted on by DNA helicase Srs2 to prevent formation of the double Holliday junction in order for the SDSA pathway to occur. The invading 3' strand is thus extended along the recipient homologous DNA duplex by DNA polymerase in the 5' to 3' direction, so that the D-loop physically translocates – a process referred to as bubble migration DNA synthesis. The resulting single Holliday junction then slides down the DNA duplex in the same direction in a process called branch migration, displacing the extended strand from the template strand. This displaced strand pops up to form a 3' overhang in the original double-stranded break duplex, which can then anneal to the opposite end of the original break through complementary base pairing. Thus DNA synthesis fills in gaps left over from annealing, and extends both ends of the still present single stranded DNA break, ligating all remaining gaps to produce recombinant non-crossover DNA.

SDSA is unique in that D-loop translocation results in conservative rather than semiconservative replication, as the first extended strand is displaced from its template strand, leaving the homologous duplex intact. Therefore, although SDSA produces non-crossover products because flanking markers of heteroduplex DNA are not exchanged, gene conversion may occur, wherein nonreciprocal genetic transfer takes place between two homologous sequences.

== Enzymes employed in SDSA during meiosis ==
Assembly of a nucleoprotein filament comprising single-stranded DNA (ssDNA) and the RecA homolog, Rad51, is a key step necessary for homology search during recombination. In the budding yeast Saccharomyces cerevisiae, Srs2 translocase dismantles Rad51 filaments during meiosis. By directly interacting with Rad51, Srs2 dislodges Rad51 from nucleoprotein filaments thereby inhibiting Rad51-dependent formation of joint molecules and D-loop structures. This dismantling activity is specific for Rad51 since Srs2 does not dismantle DMC1 (a meiosis-specific Rad51 homolog), Rad52 (a Rad 51 mediator) or replication protein A (RPA, a single-stranded DNA binding protein). Srs2 promotes the non-crossover SDSA pathway, apparently by regulating RAD51 binding during strand exchange.

Divergence between SDSA and double-Holliday junction occurs when the D-loop is disassembled allow the nascent strand to anneal to other resected end of the DSB (in the double-Holliday junction model the strand displaced by D-loop extension anneals to the other end of the DSB in "2nd end capture"). Research in Drosophila melanogaster identified the Bloom syndrome helicase (Blm) as the enzyme promoting disassembly of the D-loop. Similarly, S. cerevisiae Sgs1, an ortholog of BLM, appears to be a central regulator of most of the recombination events that occur during S. cerevisiae meiosis. Sgs1(BLM) may disassemble D-loop structures analogous to early strand invasion intermediates and thus promote NCO formation by SDSA. The Sgs1 helicase forms a conserved complex with the topoisomerase III (Top3)-RMI1 heterodimer (that catalyzes DNA single strand passage). This complex, called STR (for its three components), promotes early formation of NCO recombinants by SDSA during meiosis.

As reviewed by Uringa et al. the RTEL1 helicase is proposed to regulate recombination during meiosis in the worm Caenorhabditis elegans. RTEL1 is a key protein in repair of DSBs. It disrupts D-loops and is thought to promote NCO outcomes through SDSA.

The number of DSBs created during meiosis can substantially exceed the number of final CO events. In the plant Arabidopsis thaliana, only about 4% of DSBs are repaired by CO recombination, suggesting that most DSBs are repaired by NCO recombination. Data based on tetrad analysis from several species of fungi show that only a minority (on average about 34%) of recombination events during meiosis are COs (see Whitehouse, Tables 19 and 38 for summaries of data from S. cerevisiae, Podospora anserina, Sordaria fimicola and Sordaria brevicollis). In the fruit fly D. melanogaster during meiosis in females there is at least a 3:1 ratio of NCOs to COs. These observations indicate that the majority of recombination events during meiosis are NCOs, and suggest that SDSA is the principal pathway for recombination during meiosis.
