= Bloom syndrome =

Genetic disorder

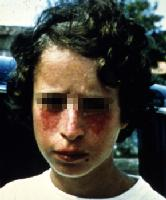
- Individual with Bloom syndrome displaying "butterfly rash".
- Specialty: Medical genetics

Bloom syndrome (often abbreviated as BS in literature) is a rare autosomal recessive genetic disorder characterized by short stature, predisposition to the development of cancer, and genomic instability. BS is caused by mutations in the BLM gene, which is a member of the RecQ DNA helicase family. Mutations in genes encoding other members of this family, namely WRN and RECQL4, are associated with the clinical entities Werner syndrome and Rothmund–Thomson syndrome, respectively. More broadly, Bloom syndrome is a member of a class of clinical entities that are characterized by chromosomal instability, genomic instability, or both, and cancer predisposition.

Cells from a person with Bloom syndrome exhibit a striking genomic instability that includes excessive crossovers between homologous chromosomes and sister chromatid exchanges (SCEs). New York dermatologist Dr. David Bloom discovered and first described the condition in 1954.

Bloom syndrome has also appeared in the older literature as Bloom–Torre–Machacek syndrome.

== Signs and symptoms ==
The most prominent feature of Bloom syndrome is proportional small size. The small size is apparent in utero. At birth, neonates exhibit rostral to caudal lengths, head circumferences, and birth weights that are typically below the third percentile.

The second most commonly noted feature is a facial rash that develops early in life due to sun exposure. The facial rash appears most prominently on the cheeks, nose, and around the lips. It is described as erythematous, which is red and inflamed, and telangiectatic, which is characterized by dilated blood vessels at the skin's surface. The rash commonly also affects the backs of the hands and neck, and it can develop on any other sun-exposed areas of the skin. The rash is variably expressed, being present in a majority but not all persons with Bloom syndrome, and, on average, less severe in females than in males. Moreover, the sun sensitivity can resolve in adulthood. There are other dermatologic changes, including hypo-pigmented and hyper-pigmented areas, cafe-au-lait spots, and telangiectasias, which can appear on the face and on the ocular surface.

There is a characteristic facial appearance that includes a long, narrow face; prominent nose, cheeks, and ears; and micrognathism or undersized jaw. The voice is high-pitched and squeaky.

There are a variety of other features that are commonly associated with Bloom syndrome. There is a moderate immune deficiency, characterized by deficiency in certain immunoglobulin classes and a generalized proliferative defect of B and T cells. The immune deficiency is thought to be the cause of recurrent pneumonia and middle ear infections in persons with the syndrome. Infants can exhibit frequent gastrointestinal upsets, with reflux, vomiting, and diarrhea, and there is a remarkable lack in interest in food. There are endocrine disturbances, particularly abnormalities of carbohydrate metabolism, insulin resistance and susceptibility to type 2 diabetes, dyslipidemia, and compensated hypothyroidism. Persons with Bloom syndrome exhibit a paucity of subcutaneous fat. There is reduced fertility, characterized by a failure in males to produce sperm (azoospermia) and premature cessation of menses (premature menopause) in females. Despite these reductions, several women with Bloom syndrome have had children, and there is a single report of a male with Bloom syndrome bearing children.

Although some people with Bloom syndrome can struggle in school with subjects that require abstract thought, there is no evidence that intellectual disability is more common in Bloom syndrome than in other people.

The most serious and frequent complication of Bloom syndrome is cancer. In the 281 persons followed by the Bloom Syndrome Registry, 145 persons (51.6%) have been diagnosed with a malignant neoplasm, and there have been 227 malignancies. The types of cancer and the anatomic sites at which they develop resemble the cancers that affect persons in the general population. The age of diagnosis for these cancers is earlier than for the same cancer in normal persons, and many persons with Bloom syndrome have been diagnosed with multiple cancers. The average life span is approximately 27 years. The most common cause of death in Bloom syndrome is cancer. Other complications of the disorder include chronic obstructive lung disease and type 2 diabetes.

There is a closely related entity that is now referred to as Bloom-syndrome-like disorder (BSLD) which is caused by mutations in components of the same protein complex to which the BLM gene product belongs, including TOP3A, which encodes the type I topoisomerase, topoisomerase 3 alpha, RMI1, and RMI2. The features of BSLD include small size and dermatologic findings, such as cafe-au-lait spots, and the presence of the once pathognomonic elevated SCEs is reported for persons with mutations in TOP3A and RMI1.

Bloom syndrome shares some features with Fanconi anemia, possibly because there is overlap in the function of the proteins mutated in this related disorder.

== Genetics ==
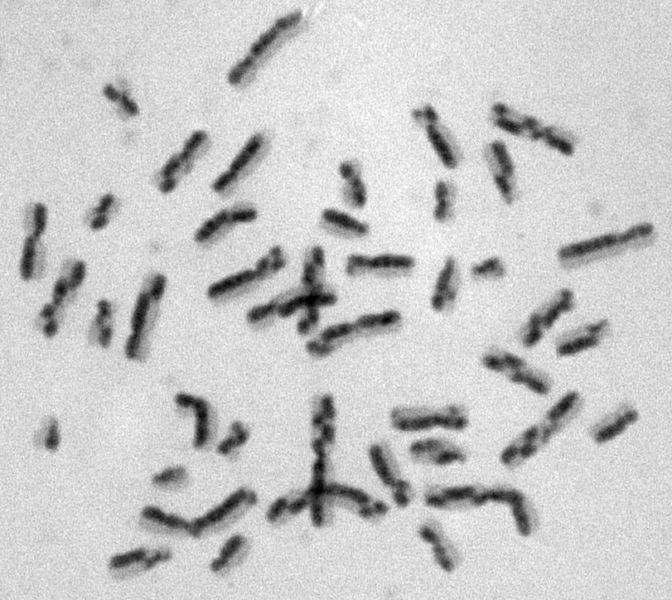
Bloom syndrome metaphase cells exhibit frequent sister chromatid exchanges.

Bloom syndrome is an autosomal recessive disorder, caused by mutations in the maternally- and paternally-derived copies of the gene BLM. As in other autosomal recessive conditions, the parents of an individual with Bloom syndrome do not necessarily exhibit any features of the syndrome. The mutations in BLM associated with Bloom syndrome are nulls and catalytically inactive missense mutations. The cells from persons with Bloom syndrome exhibit a striking genomic instability that is characterized by hyper-recombination and hyper-mutation. Human BLM cells are sensitive to DNA-damaging agents such as UV and methyl methanesulfonate, indicating deficient repair capability. At the chromosomal level, the rate of sister chromatid exchange in Bloom's syndrome is approximately 10-fold higher than normal, and quadriradial figures, which are the cytologic manifestations of crossing-over between homologous chromosomes, are highly elevated. Other chromosome manifestations include chromatid breaks and gaps, telomere associations, and fragmented chromosomes. The hyper-recombination can also be detected by molecular assays The BLM gene encodes a member of the protein family referred to as RecQ helicases. The diffusion of BLM has been measured to 1.34 $\tfrac{\mathrm{\mu m}^2}{\mathrm{s}}$ in nucleoplasm and 0.13 $\textstyle \tfrac{\mathrm{\mu m}^2}{\mathrm{s}}$ at nucleoli DNA helicases are enzymes that attach to DNA and temporarily unravel the double helix of the DNA molecule. DNA helicases function in DNA replication and DNA repair. BLM very likely functions in DNA replication, as cells from persons with Bloom syndrome exhibit multiple defects in DNA replication, and they are sensitive to agents that obstruct DNA replication.

The BLM helicase is a member of a protein complex with topoisomerase III alpha, RMI1, and RMI2, also known as BTRR, Bloom Syndrome complex, or the dissolvasome. Disruption of the proper assembly of the Bloom Syndrome complex leads to genome stability, genetic dependence on cellular nucleases GEN1 and MUS81, and loss of normal cell growth. Bloom-like phenotypes have been associated with mutations in topoisomerase III alpha, RMI1 and RMI2 genes.

=== Relationship to cancer and aging ===
As noted above, there is a greatly elevated rate of mutation in Bloom syndrome, and the genomic instability is associated with a high risk of cancer in affected individuals. The cancer predisposition is characterized by 1) broad spectrum, including leukemias, lymphomas, and carcinomas, 2) early age of onset relative to the same cancer in the general population, and 3) multiplicity, that is, synchronous or metachronous cancers. There was at least one person with Bloom syndrome who had five independent primary cancers. People with Bloom syndrome may develop cancer at any age. The average age of cancer diagnoses in the cohort is approximately 26 years old.

== Pathophysiology ==
When a cell prepares to divide to form two cells, the chromosomes are duplicated so that each new cell will get a complete set of chromosomes. The duplication process is called DNA replication. Errors made during DNA replication can lead to mutations. The BLM protein is important in maintaining the stability of the DNA during the replication process. Lack of BLM protein or protein activity leads to an increase in mutations; however, the molecular mechanism(s) by which BLM maintains the stability of the chromosomes is still a very active area of research.

Persons with Bloom syndrome have an enormous increase in exchange events between homologous chromosomes or sister chromatids (the two DNA molecules that are produced by the DNA replication process), and there are increases in chromosome breakage and rearrangements compared to persons who do not have Bloom's syndrome. Direct connections between the molecular processes in which BLM operates and the chromosomes themselves are under investigation. The relationships between molecular defects in Bloom syndrome cells, the chromosome mutations that accumulate in somatic cells (the cells of the body), and the many clinical features seen in Bloom syndrome are also areas of intense research.

Bloom syndrome has an autosomal recessive pattern of inheritance.

== Diagnosis ==
Bloom syndrome is diagnosed using any of three tests: the presence of quadriradial (Qr, a four-armed chromatid interchange) in cultured blood lymphocytes, and/or the elevated levels of sister chromatid exchange in cells of any type, and/or the mutation in the BLM gene. The US Food and Drug Administration (FDA) announced on February 19, 2015, that they have authorized the marketing of a direct-to-consumer genetic test from 23andMe. The test is designed to identify healthy individuals who carry a gene that could cause Bloom Syndrome in their offspring.

== Treatment ==
Bloom syndrome has no specific treatment; however, avoiding sun exposure and using sunscreens can help prevent some of the cutaneous changes associated with photo-sensitivity. Efforts to minimize exposure to other known environmental mutagens are also advisable in multiple forms.

== Epidemiology ==
Bloom syndrome is extremely rare in most populations, and its frequency has not been well-characterized. However, the disorder is relatively more common amongst people of Central and Eastern European Ashkenazi Jewish background. Approximately 1 in 48,000 Ashkenazi Jews are affected by Bloom syndrome, who account for about one-third of affected individuals worldwide.

=== Bloom's Syndrome Registry ===
The Bloom's Syndrome Registry lists 283 individuals reported to have this rare disorder (as of 2020), collected from the time it was first recognized in 1954. The registry was developed as a surveillance mechanism to observe the effects of cancer in the patients, which has shown 122 individuals have been diagnosed with cancer. It also acts as a report to show current findings and data on all aspects of the disorder.

== See also ==
- Accelerated aging disease
- Bloom syndrome (gene)
- DNA repair
- Progeria
- Tumor M2-PK
