= RECQL4 =

Protein-coding gene in the species Homo sapiens

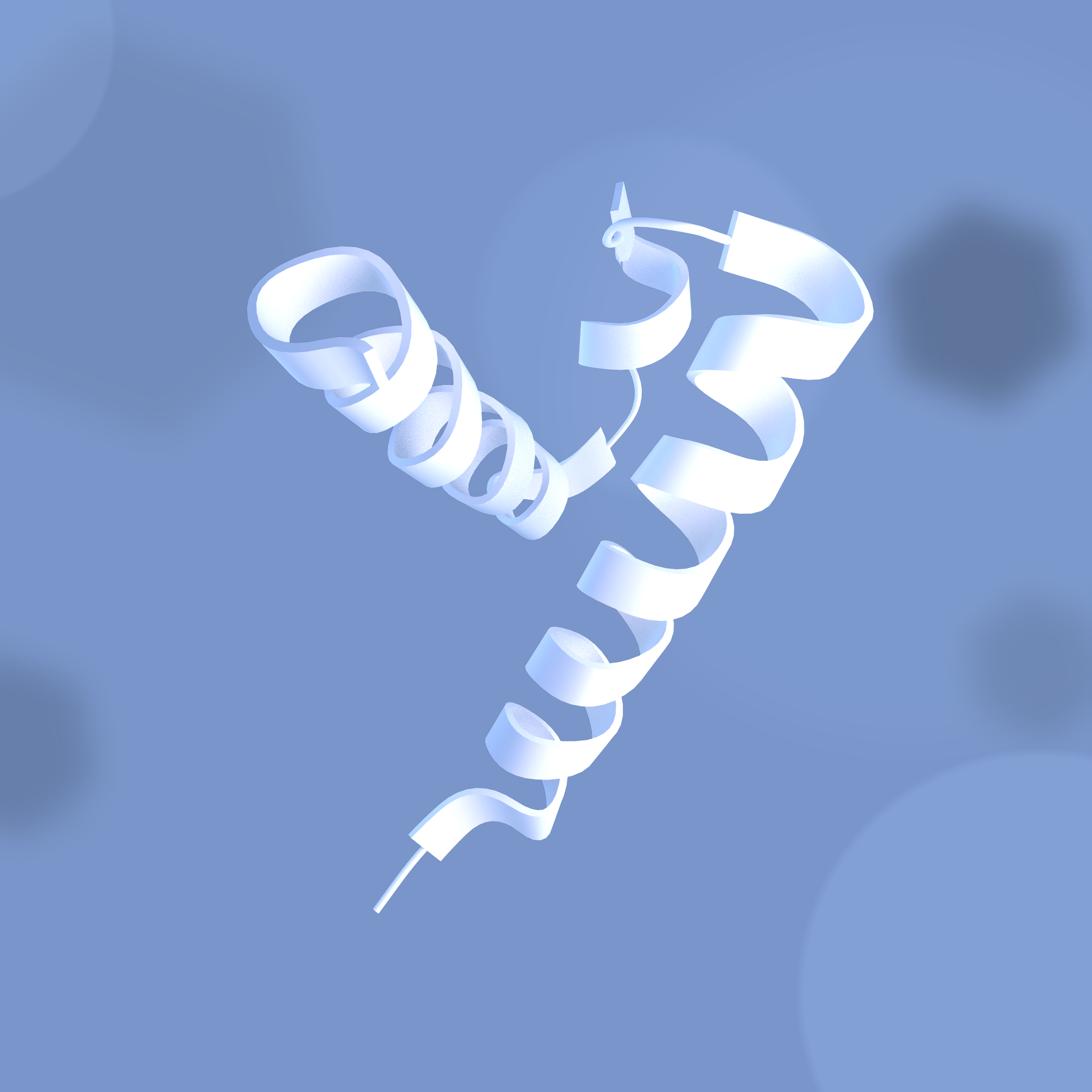

Identifiers
- Aliases: RECQL4, RECQ4, RecQ like helicase 4
- External IDs: OMIM: 603780; MGI: 1931028; GeneCards: RECQL4
Available structures
PDB	Ortholog search: PDBe RCSB
PDB	List of PDB id codes 2KMU
Enzyme activity
EC #	BRENDA	ExPASy	KEGG	MetaCyc
5.6.2.4	↗	↗	↗	↗

Gene location (Human)
Chr.	Chromosome 8 (human)
Band	8q24.3	Start	144,511,288 bp
Band	8q24.3	End	144,517,845 bp

Gene location (Mouse)
Chr.	Chromosome 15 (mouse)
Band	15|15 D3	Start	76,587,753 bp
Band	15|15 D3	End	76,594,748 bp
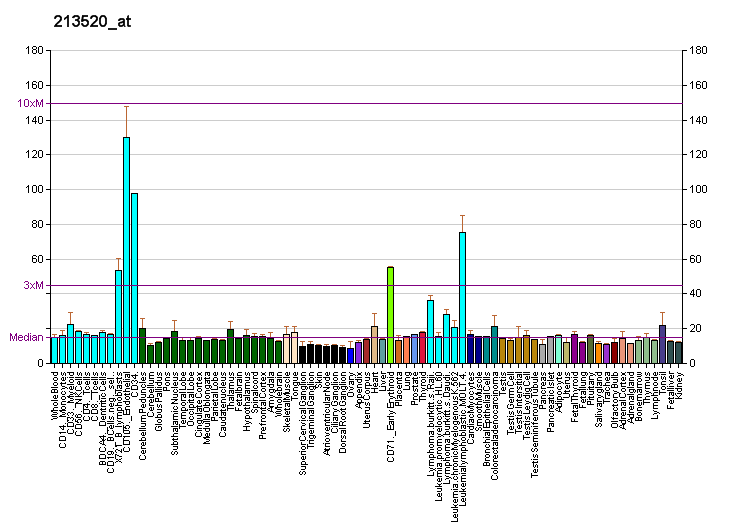
RNA expression pattern
Bgee	Human / Mouse (ortholog); Top expressed in: ventricular zone; mucosa of transverse colon; right testis; left testis; right hemisphere of cerebellum; ganglionic eminence; gonad; right frontal lobe; stromal cell of endometrium; putamen / Top expressed in: fetal liver hematopoietic progenitor cell; epiblast; tail of embryo; primitive streak; Paneth cell; ventricular zone; genital tubercle; embryo; primary oocyte; yolk sac; More reference expression data
BioGPS	More reference expression data
Gene ontology
Molecular function	ATP-dependent DNA/DNA annealing activity; nucleotide binding; 3'-5' DNA helicase activity; bubble DNA binding; protein binding; hydrolase activity; ATP binding; helicase activity; nucleic acid binding; four-way junction helicase activity; oxidized purine DNA binding; telomeric D-loop binding; DNA binding; single-stranded DNA binding
Cellular component	membrane; cytoplasm; nucleus; telomere; chromosome
Biological process	multicellular organism development; DNA repair; base-excision repair; double-strand break repair via homologous recombination; DNA recombination; DNA replication; DNA duplex unwinding; telomeric D-loop disassembly; telomere maintenance; positive regulation of cell population proliferation; positive regulation of G2/M transition of mitotic cell cycle; positive regulation of DNA replication; DNA unwinding involved in DNA replication
Sources:Amigo / QuickGO
Orthologs
Databases	NCBI: entry; OMA: entry
Species	Human	Mouse
Entrez	9401	79456
Ensembl	ENSG00000160957	ENSMUSG00000033762
UniProt	O94761	Q75NR7
RefSeq (mRNA)	NM_004260	NM_058214
RefSeq (protein)	NP_004251	NP_478121
Location (UCSC)	Chr 8: 144.51 – 144.52 Mb	Chr 15: 76.59 – 76.59 Mb
PubMed search
- Wikidata
View/Edit Human	View/Edit Mouse

ATP-dependent DNA helicase Q4 is an enzyme that in humans is encoded by the RECQL4 gene.

Mutations in RECQL4 are associated with the autosomal recessive disease Rothmund–Thomson syndrome, a disorder that has features of premature aging. In addition to the Rothmund–Thomson syndrome, RECQL4 mutations are also associated with RAPADILINO and Baller–Gerold syndromes. There are two types of Rothmund Thomson syndrome and it is Type 2 that occurs in patients carrying deleterious mutations in both copies of the RECQL4 gene. This condition is associated with a high risk of developing osteosarcoma (malignant tumor of the bone). RECQL4 gets its name from being homologous (sharing sequence) with other members of the RecQ helicase family. Two other genetic diseases are due to mutations in other RECQ helicases. Bloom syndrome is associated with mutations in the BLM gene and Werner syndrome is associated with mutations in the WRN gene.

== DNA repair ==
Double-strand breaks in DNA are potentially lethal to a cell and need to be repaired. Repair of double-strand breaks by homologous recombination (HR) is an important cellular mechanism for avoiding this lethality. RECQL4 has a crucial role in the first step of HR, referred to as end resection. When RECQL4 is deficient, end resection, and thus HR, is reduced. Evidence suggests that other forms of DNA repair including non-homologous end joining, nucleotide excision repair and base excision repair also depend on RECQL4 function. In the Rothmund-Thomson syndrome, the association of deficient RECQL4-mediated DNA repair and premature aging is consistent with the DNA damage theory of aging.
