= WRNIP1 =

Protein-coding gene in the species Homo sapiens

Identifiers
- Aliases: WRNIP1, WHIP, bA420G6.2, Werner helicase interacting protein 1, WRN helicase interacting protein 1, CFAP93, FAP93
- External IDs: OMIM: 608196; MGI: 1926153; GeneCards: WRNIP1
Available structures
PDB	Ortholog search: PDBe RCSB
PDB	List of PDB id codes 3VHS, 3VHT

Gene location (Human)
Chr.	Chromosome 6 (human)
Band	6p25.2	Start	2,765,393 bp
Band	6p25.2	End	2,786,952 bp

Gene location (Mouse)
Chr.	Chromosome 13 (mouse)
Band	13|13 A3.2	Start	32,986,021 bp
Band	13|13 A3.2	End	33,006,592 bp
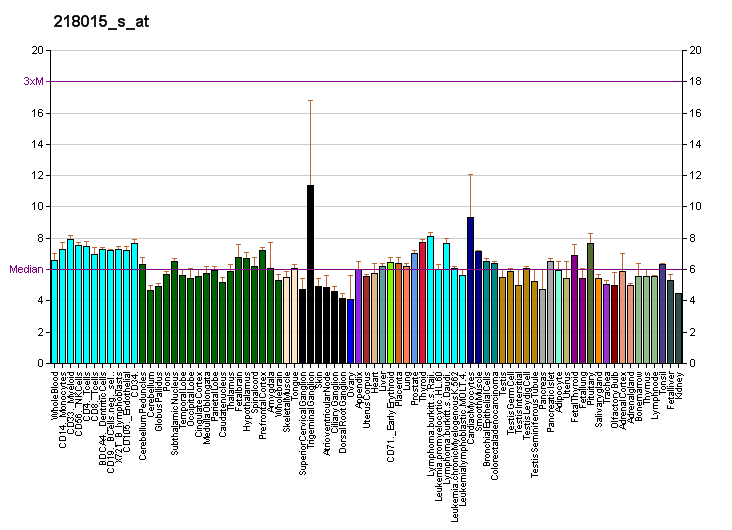
RNA expression pattern
Bgee	Human / Mouse (ortholog); Top expressed in: tendon of biceps brachii; skin of arm; internal globus pallidus; cerebellar hemisphere; right hemisphere of cerebellum; anterior pituitary; ventricular zone; cerebellar vermis; body of pancreas; myocardium of left ventricle / Top expressed in: habenula; vestibular membrane of cochlear duct; ventromedial nucleus; supraoptic nucleus; dentate gyrus of hippocampal formation granule cell; Paneth cell; dorsomedial hypothalamic nucleus; Gonadal ridge; endocardial cushion; anterior amygdaloid area; More reference expression data
BioGPS	More reference expression data
Gene ontology
Molecular function	DNA binding; nucleotide binding; ATPase activity; protein binding; hydrolase activity; ATP binding; metal ion binding; identical protein binding; enzyme activator activity; single-stranded DNA helicase activity
Cellular component	perinuclear region of cytoplasm; membrane; nucleus; cytoplasm; replisome
Biological process	DNA replication; DNA synthesis involved in DNA repair; regulation of DNA-dependent DNA replication initiation; DNA repair; cellular response to DNA damage stimulus; immune system process; DNA-dependent DNA replication; regulation of DNA repair; DNA recombination; DNA replication, Okazaki fragment processing; positive regulation of catalytic activity; innate immune response
Sources:Amigo / QuickGO
Orthologs
Databases	NCBI: entry; OMA: entry
Species	Human	Mouse
Entrez	56897	78903
Ensembl	ENSG00000124535	ENSMUSG00000021400
UniProt	Q96S55	Q91XU0
RefSeq (mRNA)	NM_020135; NM_130395	NM_030215
RefSeq (protein)	NP_064520; NP_569079	NP_084491
Location (UCSC)	Chr 6: 2.77 – 2.79 Mb	Chr 13: 32.99 – 33.01 Mb
PubMed search
- Wikidata
View/Edit Human	View/Edit Mouse

ATPase WRNIP1 is an enzyme that is encoded by the WRNIP1 gene in humans. The protein is a member of AAA ATPase family.

Werner's syndrome is a rare autosomal recessive disorder characterized by premature aging. The protein encoded by this gene interacts with the N-terminal portion of Werner protein containing the exonuclease domain. This protein shows homology to replication factor C family proteins, and is conserved from E. coli to human. Studies in yeast suggest that this gene may influence the aging process. Two transcript variants encoding different isoforms have been isolated for this gene.

== Interactions ==
WRNIP1 has been shown to interact with Werner syndrome ATP-dependent helicase.
