= Matthew Sydney Thomson =

British dermatologist

Prof Matthew Sydney Thomson FRSE FRCPE (1894–1969) was a 20th-century British dermatologist. With his predecessor August von Rothmund he gives his name to the skin condition, Rothmund–Thomson syndrome. He was affectionately known as "Tommy". He was President of the British Association of Dermatology in 1948.

== Life ==
He was born at Earlsfield, Surrey on 7 November 1894. He was educated at the Merchant Taylors' School in London. He won a scholarship to Cambridge University where he first gained a general degree (MA) then this permitted him to study Medicine, gaining a further degree (ChB). He then undertook practical training at King's College Hospital in London.

In the First World War he served as a Lieutenant in the Royal Army Medical Corps. He gained his doctorate (MD) in 1918 and began to specialise in dermatology. He began lecturing in this subject at St John's Hospital for Diseases of the Skin in London, also returning to King's College Hospital as a Physician. He became Consultant Dermatologist to London County Council.

He was elected a Fellow of the Royal Society of Edinburgh in 1934. His proposers were Cecil Wakeley, Reginald Gladstone, Frederick Hobday and Frederick Gardiner.

In the Second World War he oversaw the casualty department at King's, caring for London's air-raid victims.

In 1957 he became the Hunterian Professor at the Royal College of Surgeons.

He died on 26 April 1969.

== Family ==
In 1912 he married Dora Alice Wallis.
