= Sister chromatid exchange =

Exchange of genetic material

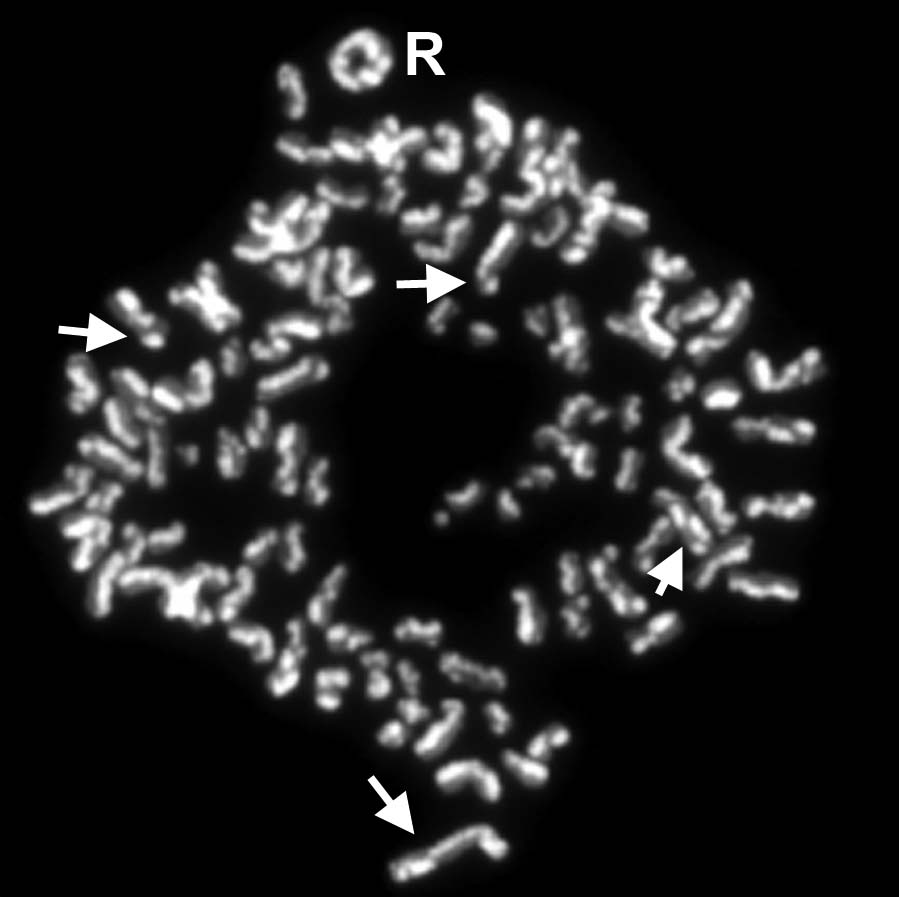
Metaphase spread of a cell line showing a ring chromosome (R) and several non-sister chromatid exchanges (SCEs), some of which are indicated by arrows.

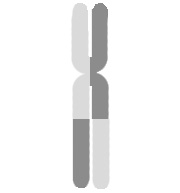
Scheme of a sister chromatid exchange. The ends of the chromatids are reversed in the lower area.

Sister chromatid exchange (SCE) is the exchange of genetic material between two identical sister chromatids.

It was first discovered by using the Giemsa staining method on one chromatid belonging to the sister chromatid complex before anaphase in mitosis. The staining revealed that few segments were passed to the sister chromatid which were not dyed. The Giemsa staining was able to stain due to the presence of bromodeoxyuridine analogous base which was introduced to the desired chromatid.

The reason for the (SCE) is not known but it is required and used as a mutagenic testing of many products. Four to five sister chromatid exchanges per chromosome pair, per mitosis is in the normal distribution, while 14–100 exchanges is not normal and presents a danger to the organism. SCE is elevated in pathologies including Bloom syndrome, having recombination rates ~10–100 times above normal, depending on cell type. Frequent SCEs may also be related to formation of tumors.

Sister chromatid exchange has also been observed more frequently in B51(+) Behçet's disease.

== Mitosis ==
Mitotic recombination in the budding yeast Saccharomyces cerevisiae is primarily a result of DNA repair processes responding to spontaneous or induced damages that occur during vegetative growth.} (Also reviewed in Bernstein and Bernstein, pp 220–221). In order for yeast cells to repair damage by homologous recombination, there must be present, in the same nucleus, a second DNA molecule containing sequence homology with the region to be repaired. In a diploid cell in G1 phase of the cell cycle, such a molecule is present in the form of the homologous chromosome. However, in the G2 phase of the cell cycle (following DNA replication), a second homologous DNA molecule is also present: the sister chromatid. Evidence indicates that, due to the special nearby relationship they share, sister chromatids are not only preferred over distant homologous chromatids as substrates for recombinational repair, but have the capacity to repair more DNA damage than do homologs.

== Meiosis ==
The genomes of diploid organisms in natural populations are highly polymorphic for insertions and deletions. During meiosis double-strand breaks (DSBs) that form within such polymorphic regions must be repaired by inter-sister chromatid exchange, rather than by inter-homolog exchange. A molecular-level study of recombination during budding yeast meiosis has shown that recombination events initiated by DSBs in regions that lack corresponding sequences in the non-sister homolog are efficiently repaired by inter-sister chromatid recombination. This recombination occurs with the same timing as inter-homolog recombination, but with reduced (2- to 3-fold) yields of Holliday junction joint molecules. This study, and comparable evidence from other organisms (e.g. Peacock), indicates that inter-sister recombination occurs frequently during meiosis, and up to one-third of all recombination events occur between sister chromatids, although mainly by a pathway that does not involve Holliday junction intermediates.

During oogenesis in the nematode Caenorhabditis elegans the sister chromatid, or even the same DNA molecule, can serve as a meiotic repair template for both crossover and non-crossover recombination. Non-crossover events are the most frequent recombination outcome. For DNA double strand breaks induced throughout meiotic prophase I, the sister or intra-chromatid substrate is available as a recombinational repair partner.

== See also ==
- Meiosis
- Homologous recombination
- Sister chromatid
