= VVD-214 =

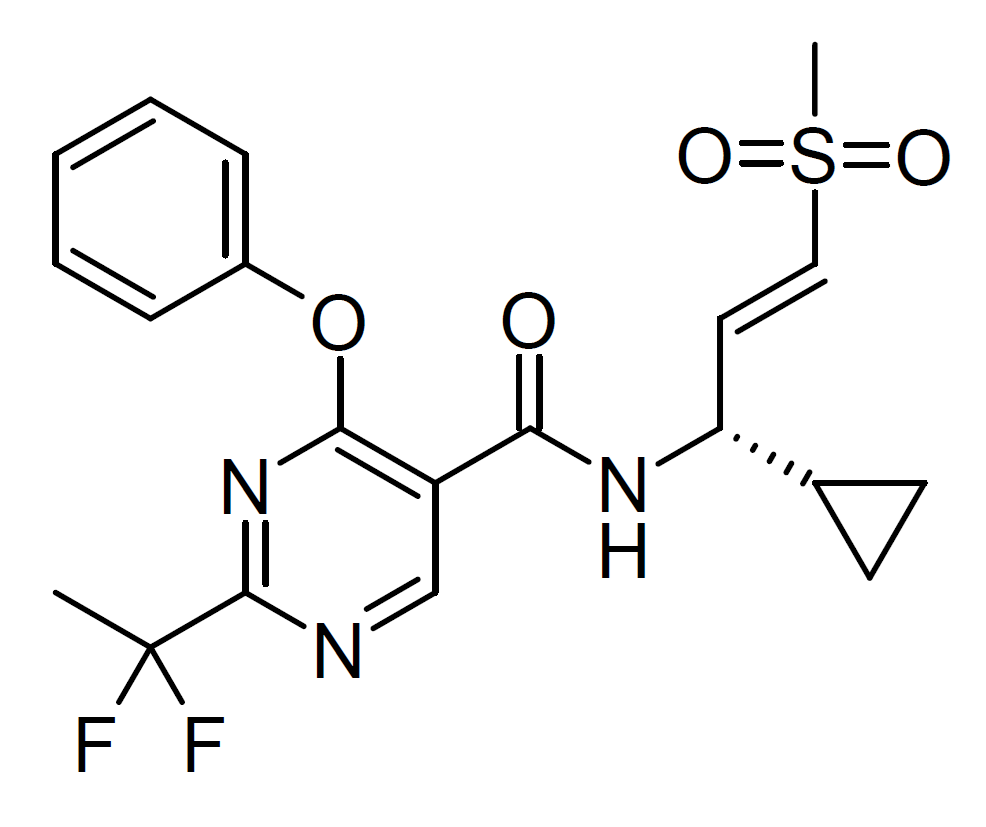

Clinical data
- Drug class: WRN helicase inhibitor

Identifiers
- IUPAC name: N-[(E,1S)-1-cyclopropyl-3-methylsulfonylprop-2-enyl]-2-(1,1-difluoroethyl)-4-phenoxypyrimidine-5-carboxamide
- CAS Number: 3026500-20-6
- PubChem CID: 170717998
- ChemSpider: 129389587

Chemical and physical data
- Formula: C_{20}H_{21}F_{2}N_{3}O_{4}S
- Molar mass: 437.46 g·mol^{−1}
- 3D model (JSmol): Interactive image
- SMILES: CC(C1=NC=C(C(=N1)OC2=CC=CC=C2)C(=O)N[C@H](/C=C/S(=O)(=O)C)C3CC3)(F)F
- InChI: InChI=1S/C20H21F2N3O4S/c1-20(21,22)19-23-12-15(18(25-19)29-14-6-4-3-5-7-14)17(26)24-16(13-8-9-13)10-11-30(2,27)28/h3-7,10-13,16H,8-9H2,1-2H3,(H,24,26)/b11-10+/t16-/m1/s1; Key:UWPFUBNCDABUEE-SIFUEBAJSA-N

VVD-214 (RO7589831) is a drug which acts as an inhibitor of the enzyme WRN helicase. It is being researched for the treatment of microsatellite instability high forms of cancer.
