= TOP3A =

Protein-coding gene in the species Homo sapiens

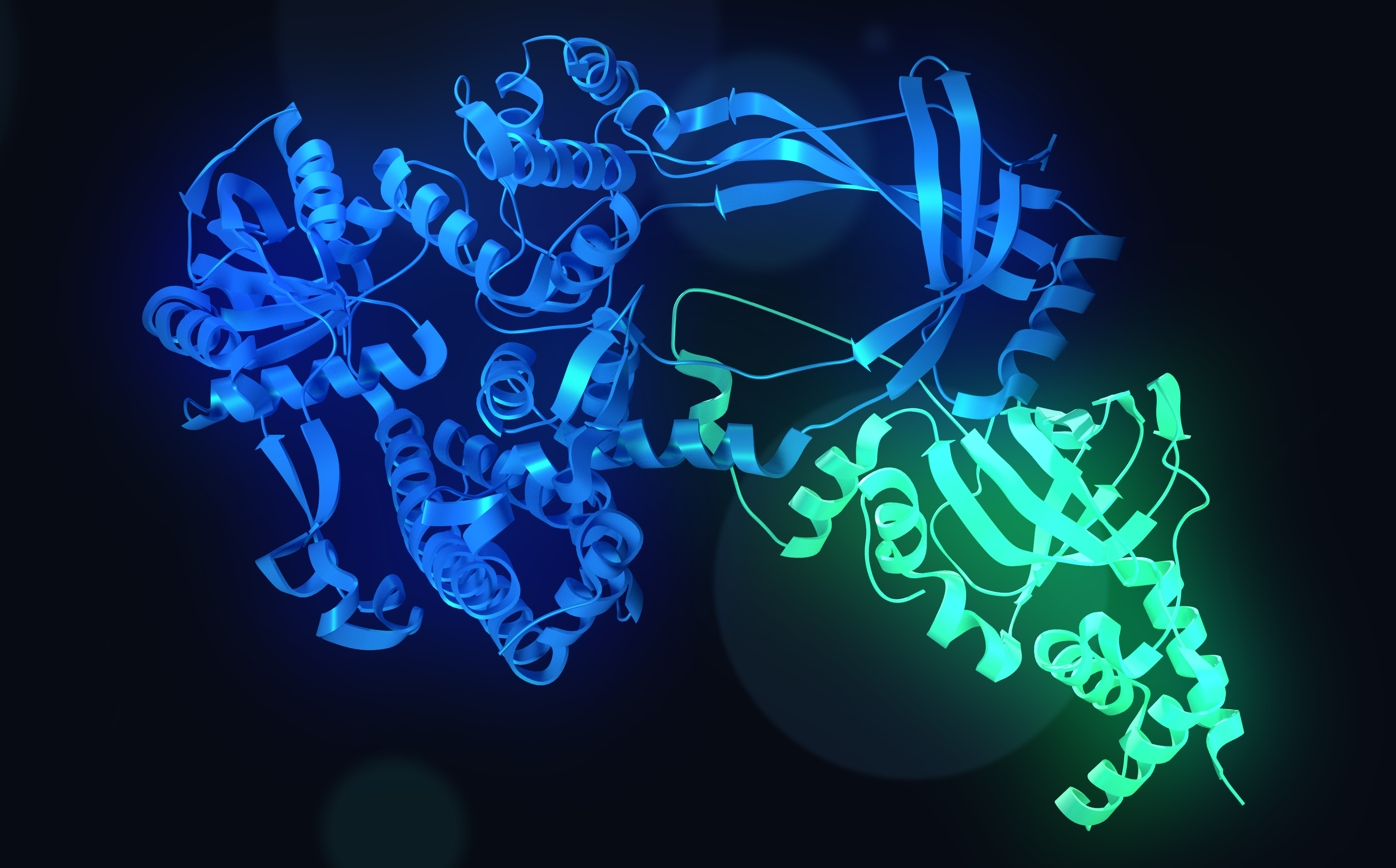

Identifiers
- Aliases: TOP3A, TOP3, ZGRF7, topoisomerase (DNA) III alpha, DNA topoisomerase III alpha, PEOB5, MGRISCE2
- External IDs: OMIM: 601243; MGI: 1197527; GeneCards: TOP3A
Available structures
PDB	Ortholog search: PDBe RCSB
PDB	List of PDB id codes 4CGY, 4CHT
Enzyme activity
EC #	BRENDA	ExPASy	KEGG	MetaCyc
5.6.2.1	↗	↗	↗	↗

Gene location (Human)
Chr.	Chromosome 17 (human)
Band	17p11.2	Start	18,271,428 bp
Band	17p11.2	End	18,315,007 bp

Gene location (Mouse)
Chr.	Chromosome 11 (mouse)
Band	11|11 B2	Start	60,630,884 bp
Band	11|11 B2	End	60,668,191 bp
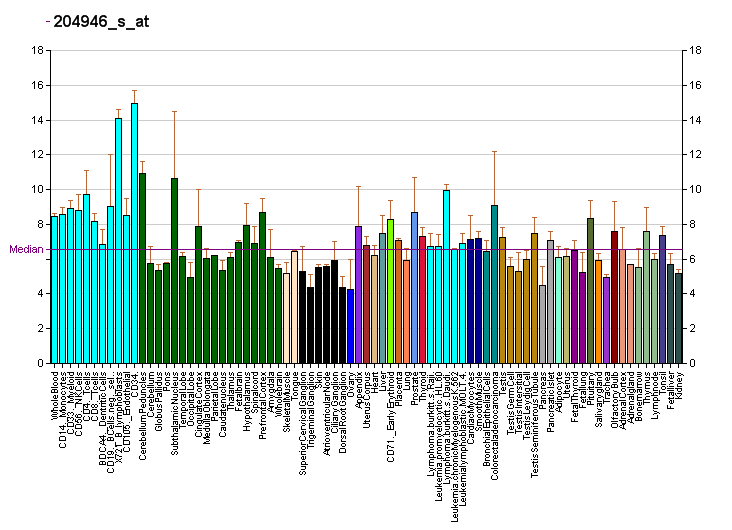

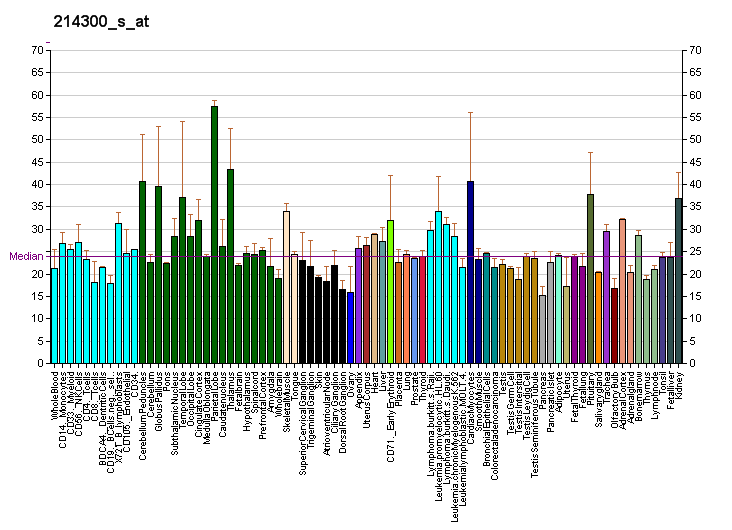
RNA expression pattern
Bgee	Human / Mouse (ortholog); Top expressed in: blood; ganglionic eminence; ventricular zone; bone marrow cell; monocyte; stromal cell of endometrium; granulocyte; tonsil; epithelium of colon; testicle / Top expressed in: spermatocyte; zygote; secondary oocyte; spermatid; tail of embryo; primary oocyte; Ileal epithelium; genital tubercle; epiblast; seminiferous tubule; More reference expression data
BioGPS	More reference expression data
Gene ontology
Molecular function	DNA topoisomerase type I (single strand cut, ATP-independent) activity; DNA binding; zinc ion binding; protein binding; isomerase activity; metal ion binding; DNA topoisomerase activity; single-stranded DNA binding; nucleic acid binding
Cellular component	PML body; nucleoplasm; chromosome; nucleus; mitochondrion; mitochondrial matrix
Biological process	DNA replication; DNA topological change; meiosis; mitochondrial DNA metabolic process; chromosome separation; regulation of signal transduction by p53 class mediator
Sources:Amigo / QuickGO
Orthologs
Databases	NCBI: entry; OMA: entry
Species	Human	Mouse
Entrez	7156	21975
Ensembl	ENSG00000284238; ENSG00000177302	ENSMUSG00000002814
UniProt	Q13472	O70157
RefSeq (mRNA)	NM_004618; NM_001320759	NM_009410
RefSeq (protein)	NP_001307688; NP_004609	NP_033436
Location (UCSC)	Chr 17: 18.27 – 18.32 Mb	Chr 11: 60.63 – 60.67 Mb
PubMed search
- Wikidata
View/Edit Human	View/Edit Mouse

DNA topoisomerase 3-alpha is an enzyme that in humans is encoded by the TOP3A gene.

== Function ==
This gene encodes a DNA topoisomerase, an enzyme that controls and alters the topologic states of DNA during transcription. This enzyme catalyzes the transient breaking and rejoining of a single strand of DNA which allows the strands to pass through one another, thus reducing the number of supercoils and altering the topology of DNA. This enzyme forms a complex with BLM which functions in the regulation of recombination in somatic cells.

== Meiosis ==
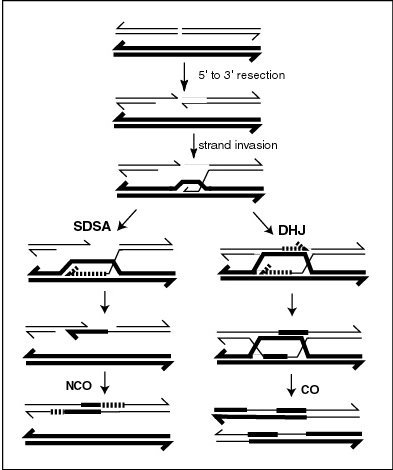
A current model of meiotic recombination, initiated by a double-strand break or gap, followed by pairing with an homologous chromosome and strand invasion to initiate the recombinational repair process. Repair of the gap can lead to crossover (CO) or non-crossover (NCO) of the flanking regions. CO recombination is thought to occur by the Double Holliday Junction (DHJ) model, illustrated on the right, above. NCO recombinants are thought to occur primarily by the Synthesis Dependent Strand Annealing (SDSA) model, illustrated on the left, above. Most recombination events appear to be the SDSA type.

Recombination during meiosis is often initiated by a DNA double-strand break (DSB). During recombination, sections of DNA at the 5' ends of the break are cut away in a process called resection. In the strand invasion step that follows, an overhanging 3' end of the broken DNA molecule then "invades" the DNA of an homologous chromosome that is not broken forming a displacement loop (D-loop). After strand invasion, the further sequence of events may follow either of two main pathways leading to a crossover (CO) or a non-crossover (NCO) recombinant (see Genetic recombination and see Figure). The pathway leading to a NCO is referred to as Synthesis-dependent strand annealing (SDSA).

In the plant Arabidopsis thaliana, multiple mechanisms limit meiotic COs. During meiosis TOP3A and RECQ4A/B helicase antagonize formation of COs in parallel to FANCM helicase. Sequela-Arnaud et al. suggested that CO numbers are restricted because of the long-term costs of CO recombination, that is, the breaking up of favorable genetic combinations of alleles built up by past natural selection.

In the budding yeast Saccharomyces cerevisiae, the topoisomerase III (TOP3)-RMI1 heterodimer (that catalyzes DNA single-strand passage) forms a conserved complex with Sgs1 helicase (an ortholog of the human Bloom syndrome helicase). This complex promotes early formation of NCO recombinants during meiosis The TOP3-RMI1 strand passage activity appears to have two important functions during meiosis. First, strand passage activity is employed early in coordination with Sgs1 helicase to promote proper recombination pathway choice. Second, strand passage activity is used later, independently of Sgs1 helicase, to prevent the persistence of unresolvable strand entanglements in recombination intermediates.

== Interactions ==
TOP3A has been shown to interact with Bloom syndrome protein.
