= RAD52 =

Protein-coding gene in the species Homo sapiens

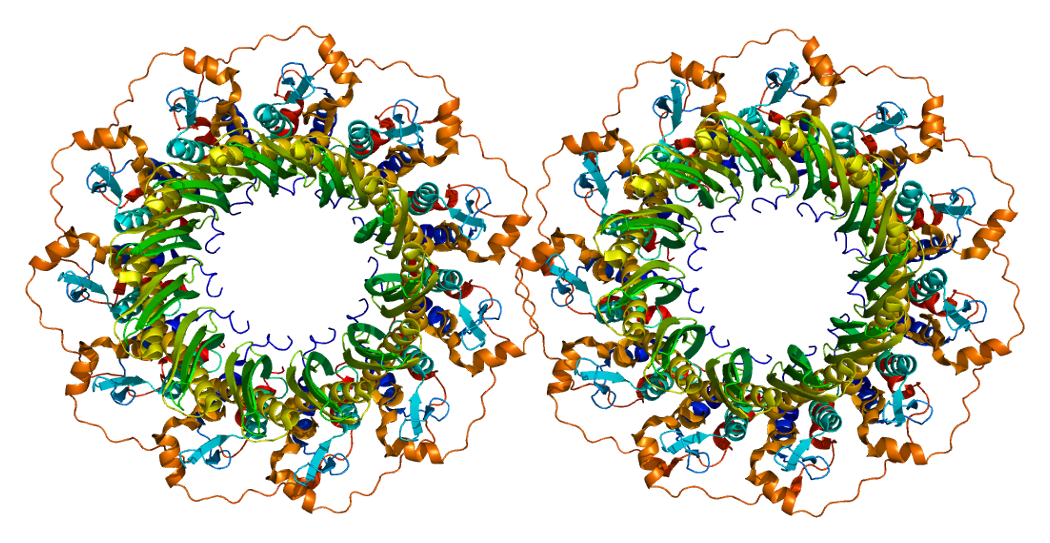

Identifiers
- Aliases: RAD52, RAD52 homolog, DNA repair protein
- External IDs: OMIM: 600392; MGI: 101949; GeneCards: RAD52
Available structures
PDB	Ortholog search: PDBe RCSB
PDB	List of PDB id codes 1H2I, 1KN0

Gene location (Human)
Chr.	Chromosome 12 (human)
Band	12p13.33	Start	911,736 bp
Band	12p13.33	End	990,053 bp

Gene location (Mouse)
Chr.	Chromosome 6 (mouse)
Band	6 F1|6 56.86 cM	Start	119,879,659 bp
Band	6 F1|6 56.86 cM	End	119,899,789 bp
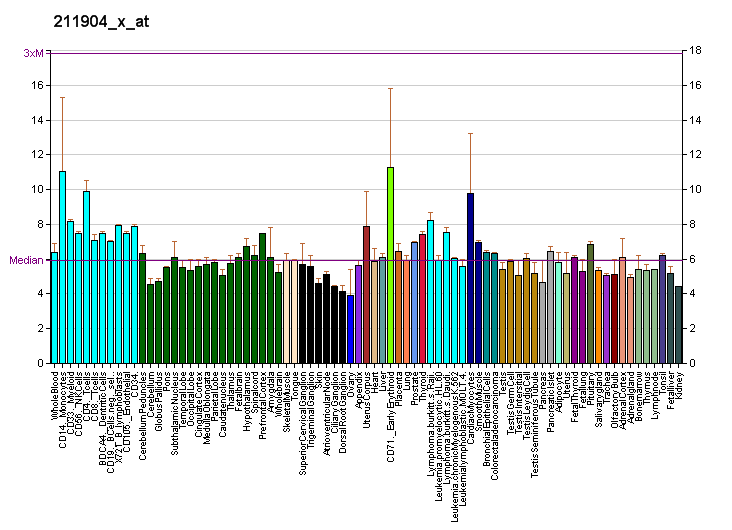

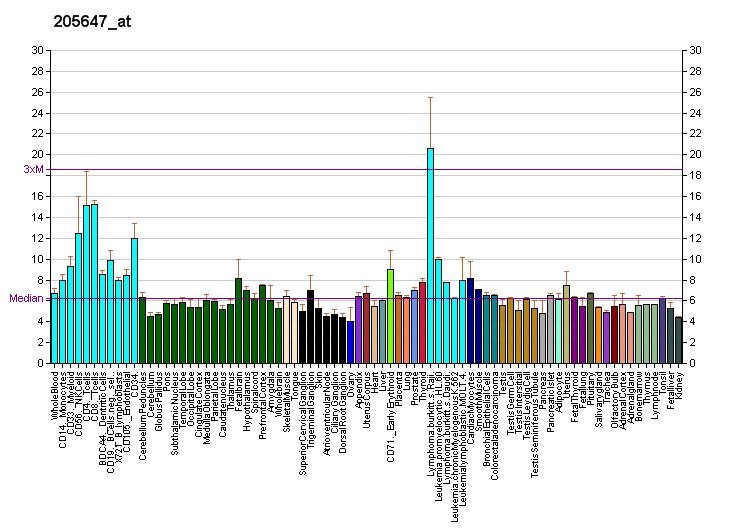

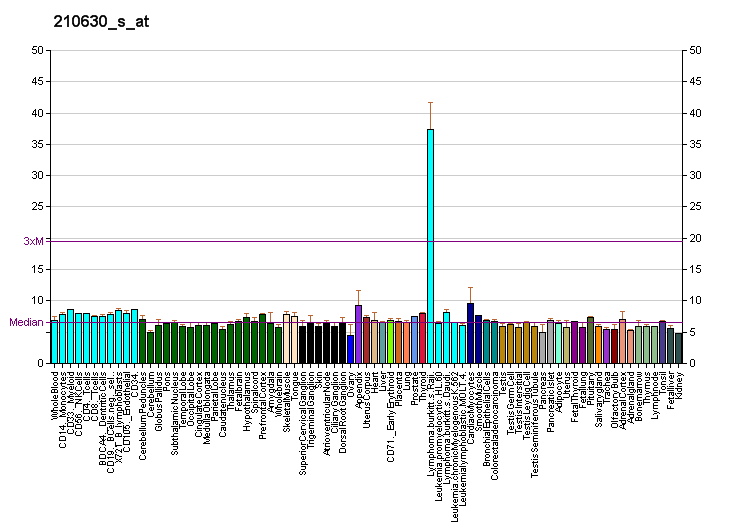
RNA expression pattern
Bgee	Human / Mouse (ortholog); Top expressed in: right uterine tube; sural nerve; right lobe of thyroid gland; mucosa of transverse colon; buccal mucosa cell; right hemisphere of cerebellum; right ovary; canal of the cervix; left ovary; left lobe of thyroid gland / Top expressed in: ascending aorta; genital tubercle; aortic valve; tail of embryo; granulocyte; muscle of thigh; zygote; secondary oocyte; superior frontal gyrus; primary visual cortex; More reference expression data
BioGPS	More reference expression data
Gene ontology
Molecular function	DNA binding; protein binding; single-stranded DNA binding; identical protein binding
Cellular component	nucleus; nucleoplasm; protein-DNA complex; protein-containing complex
Biological process	DNA double-strand break processing involved in repair via single-strand annealing; DNA recombinase assembly; cellular response to oxidative stress; DNA recombination; double-strand break repair via single-strand annealing; regulation of nucleotide-excision repair; double-strand break repair; cellular response to DNA damage stimulus; DNA repair; double-strand break repair via homologous recombination; protein homooligomerization; mitotic recombination
Sources:Amigo / QuickGO
Orthologs
Databases	NCBI: entry; OMA: entry
Species	Human	Mouse
Entrez	5893	19365
Ensembl	ENSG00000002016	ENSMUSG00000030166
UniProt	P43351	P43352
RefSeq (mRNA)	NM_001297419; NM_001297420; NM_001297421; NM_001297422; NM_134422 NM_134423; NM_134424	NM_001166381; NM_001166382; NM_001166383; NM_011236
RefSeq (protein)	NP_001284348; NP_001284349; NP_001284350; NP_001284351; NP_602296	NP_001159853; NP_001159854; NP_001159855; NP_035366
Location (UCSC)	Chr 12: 0.91 – 0.99 Mb	Chr 6: 119.88 – 119.9 Mb
PubMed search
- Wikidata
View/Edit Human	View/Edit Mouse

RAD52 homolog (S. cerevisiae), also known as RAD52, is a protein which in humans is encoded by the RAD52 gene.

== Function ==
The protein encoded by this gene shares similarity with Saccharomyces cerevisiae Rad52, a protein important for DNA double-strand break repair and homologous recombination. This gene product was shown to bind single-stranded DNA ends, and mediate the DNA-DNA interaction necessary for the annealing of complementary DNA strands. It was also found to interact with DNA recombination protein RAD51, which suggested its role in RAD51-related DNA recombination and repair.

== Role in DNA recombination repair ==
RAD52 mediates RAD51 function in homologous recombinational repair (HRR) in both yeast Saccharomyces cerevisiae and in mammalian cells of mice and humans. However, the RAD52 protein has distinctly different functions in HRR of yeast and humans. In S. cerevisiae, Rad52 protein, acting alone, facilitates the loading of Rad51 protein onto single-stranded DNA pre-coated with replication protein A in the presynaptic phase of recombination. In yeast, the function controlled by the RAD52 gene is essential for normal meiosis. It appears that the normal functions specified by RAD52 are not essential for either the initial or terminal steps in meiosis, but are required for successful recombination.

In mice and humans, however, BRCA2 primarily mediates orderly assembly of RAD51 on ssDNA, the form that is active for homologous pairing and strand invasion. BRCA2 also redirects RAD51 from dsDNA and prevents dissociation from ssDNA. In addition, the four paralogs of RAD51, consisting of RAD51B (RAD51L1), RAD51C (RAD51L2), RAD51D (RAD51L3), XRCC2 form a complex called the BCDX2 complex. This complex participates in RAD51 recruitment or stabilization at damage sites. The BCDX2 complex appears to act by facilitating the assembly or stability of the RAD51 nucleoprotein filament. However, in the presence of a BRCA2 mutation, human RAD52 can mediate RAD51 assembly on ssDNA and substitute for BRCA2 in homologous recombinational DNA repair, though with lower efficiency than BRCA2.

In addition, human RAD52, in combination with ERCC1, promotes the error-prone homologous DNA repair pathway of single-strand annealing. Though error prone, this repair pathway may be needed for survival of cells with DNA damage that is not otherwise repairable.

Human RAD52 also has an important role in repair of DNA double-strand breaks at active transcription sites during the G0/G1 phase of the cell cycle. Repair of these double-strand breaks appears to use an RNA template-based recombination mechanism dependent on RAD52. The Cockayne Syndrome B protein (CSB) (coded for by ERCC6) localizes at double-strand breaks at sites of active transcription, followed by RAD51, RAD51C and RAD52 to carry out homologous recombinational repair using the newly synthesized RNA as a template.

== microRNAs and cancer risk ==
Three prime untranslated regions (3'UTRs) of messenger RNAs (mRNAs) often contain regulatory sequences that can cause post-transcriptional RNA silencing. Such 3'-UTRs often contain binding sites for microRNAs (miRNAs). By binding to specific sites within the 3'-UTR, miRNAs can decrease gene expression of various mRNAs by either inhibiting translation or directly causing degradation of the transcript.

MicroRNAs (miRNAs) appear to regulate the expression of more than 60% of protein coding genes of the human genome. One microRNA, miR-210, represses RAD52. As noted by Devlin et al., miR-210 is up-regulated in most solid tumors and negatively affects the clinical outcome.

The 3'-UTR of RAD52 also has a binding site for the microRNA let-7. Women with a single-nucleotide polymorphism (SNP) in the binding site for let-7 (rs7963551), that causes reduced binding of let-7, likely have increased expression of RAD52 (as was shown for this SNP in liver). Women with this SNP in the 3'UTR of RAD52 showed a reduced breast cancer risk with an odds ratio of 0.84, 95% confidence interval of 0.75-0.95.

In a Han Chinese population, the same SNP as above in the 3'-UTR of RAD52 binding site for let-7 (rs7963551) reduced the risk of glioma. The risk of glioma associated with the RAD52 rs7963551 genotype had an odds ratio (compared to those without the SNP) of 0.44 for those older than 41 years, and an odds ratio of 0.58 for those 41 years or younger.

Li et al. found significantly decreased hepatic cellular carcinoma risk among individuals with the RAD52 rs7963551 CC genotype (the same SNP as above) compared with those with the AA genotype in a Chinese population. They also found that in 44 normal human liver tissue samples, presence of the rs7963551 SNP was associated with a significant increase of RAD52 mRNA expression.

Thus increased RAD52 expression is protective against various cancers.

Another study of altered microRNA binding sites in RAD52 and their effects on cancer susceptibility was carried out by Naccarati et al. They found two RAD52 microRNA binding sites that were frequently altered and had an effect on colon cancer risk. Individuals with a homozygous or heterozygous SNP in rs1051669 were at increased risk of colon cancer (OR 1.78, 95% CI 1.13–2.80, p = 0.01 for homozygotes and OR 1.72, 95% CI 1.10–2.692, p = 0.02 for heterozygotes). Heterozygous carriers of the other RAD52 SNP (rs11571475) were at decreased risk of colon cancer (OR 0.76, 95% CI 0.58–1.00, p = 0.05). Of 21 genes in the homologous recombinational repair pathway and 7 genes in the non-homologous end joining pathway examined, the only SNPs found in microRNA binding regions which were both at high enough frequency to evaluate and which affected risks of colon cancer, were the two in RAD52 and one in MRE11A.

DNA damage appears to be the primary underlying cause of cancer, and deficiencies in DNA repair appear to underlie many forms of cancer. If DNA repair is deficient, DNA damage tends to accumulate. Such excess DNA damage may increase mutational errors during DNA replication due to error-prone translesion synthesis. Excess DNA damage may also increase epigenetic alterations due to errors during DNA repair. Such mutations and epigenetic alterations may give rise to cancer. The frequent microRNA-induced increase or deficiency of RAD52-mediated DNA repair due to microRNA binding alterations likely contributes to either the prevention or progression of breast, brain, liver or colon cancers.

== Interactions ==
RAD52 has been shown to interact with RAD51. The Rad52 will ease the loading of Rad51 on ssDNA by interfering with the RPA protein.

=== Intragenic complementation ===
When multiple copies of a polypeptide encoded by a gene form an aggregate, this protein structure is referred to as a multimer. When a multimer is formed from polypeptides produced by two different mutant alleles of a particular gene, the mixed multimer may exhibit greater functional activity than the unmixed multimers formed by each of the mutants alone. In such a case, the phenomenon is referred to as intragenic complementation. A Saccharomyces cerevisiae RAD52 mutant allele expressing a C-terminal truncated protein was found to complement other RAD52 mutant missense alleles. This finding of intragenic complementation suggests that the RAD52 protein has a multimeric structure that allows cooperative interactions between the constituent monomers.
