= Bloom syndrome protein =

Mammalian protein found in humans

BLM
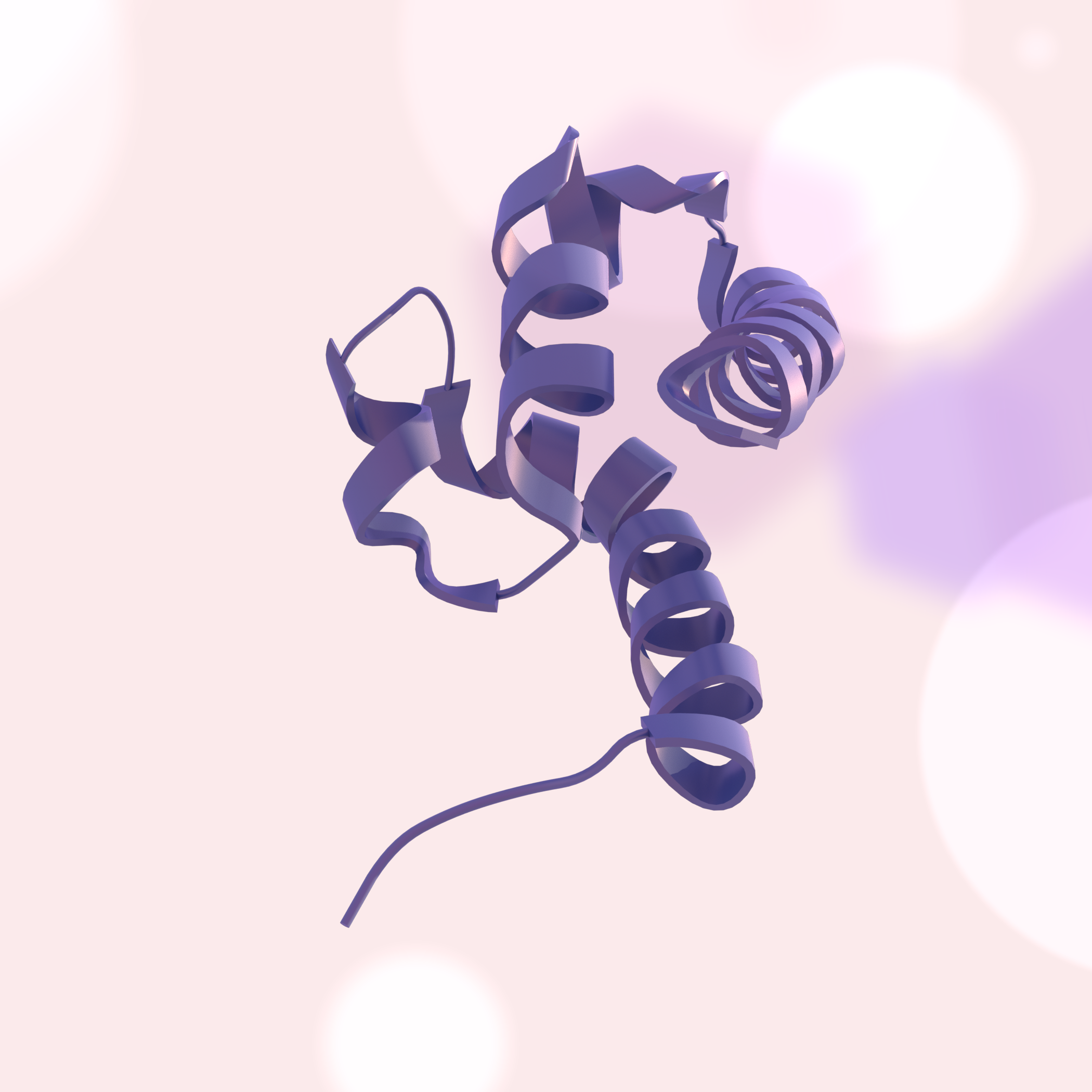

Identifiers
- Aliases: BLM, BS, RECQ2, RECQL2, RECQL3, Bloom syndrome RecQ like helicase, BLM RecQ like helicase, MGRISCE1
- External IDs: OMIM: 604610; MGI: 1328362; GeneCards: BLM
Available structures
PDB	Ortholog search: PDBe RCSB
PDB	List of PDB id codes 2KV2, 2MH9, 2RRD, 3WE2, 3WE3, 4CDG, 4CGZ, 4O3M
Enzyme activity
EC #	BRENDA	ExPASy	KEGG	MetaCyc
5.6.2.4	↗	↗	↗	↗

Gene location (Human)
Chr.	Chromosome 15 (human)
Band	15q26.1	Start	90,717,346 bp
Band	15q26.1	End	90,816,166 bp

Gene location (Mouse)
Chr.	Chromosome 7 (mouse)
Band	7 D2|7 45.65 cM	Start	80,104,481 bp
Band	7 D2|7 45.65 cM	End	80,184,867 bp
RNA expression pattern
Bgee	Human / Mouse (ortholog); Top expressed in: parotid gland; gonad; secondary oocyte; ventricular zone; ganglionic eminence; testicle; tonsil; apex of heart; trabecular bone; right auricle of heart / Top expressed in: tail of embryo; fetal liver hematopoietic progenitor cell; primitive streak; epiblast; otic placode; secondary oocyte; zygote; genital tubercle; primary oocyte; ureter; More reference expression data
BioGPS	n/a
Gene ontology
Molecular function	ATP-dependent DNA/DNA annealing activity; nucleotide binding; helicase activity; DNA helicase activity; bubble DNA binding; p53 binding; G-quadruplex DNA binding; single-stranded DNA binding; hydrolase activity, acting on acid anhydrides, in phosphorus-containing anhydrides; ATPase activity; protein binding; catalytic activity; nucleic acid binding; four-way junction helicase activity; hydrolase activity; ATP binding; 3'-5' DNA helicase activity; four-way junction DNA binding; Y-form DNA binding; forked DNA-dependent helicase activity; telomeric D-loop binding; telomeric G-quadruplex DNA binding; 8-hydroxy-2'-deoxyguanosine DNA binding; DNA binding; ATP-dependent activity, acting on DNA; zinc ion binding; protein homodimerization activity; metal ion binding
Cellular component	PML body; nuclear matrix; intracellular anatomical structure; nucleoplasm; lateral element; telomere; nuclear chromosome; nucleolus; nucleus; cytoplasm; cytosol; replication fork; chromosome; pronucleus
Biological process	DNA recombination; regulation of cyclin-dependent protein serine/threonine kinase activity; replication fork protection; DNA double-strand break processing; positive regulation of transcription, DNA-templated; negative regulation of cell division; cellular response to camptothecin; cell metabolism; protein complex oligomerization; replication fork processing; negative regulation of DNA recombination; cellular response to ionizing radiation; mitotic G2 DNA damage checkpoint signaling; response to X-ray; cellular response to hydroxyurea; DNA repair; double-strand break repair via homologous recombination; telomeric D-loop disassembly; DNA replication; t-circle formation; DNA duplex unwinding; G-quadruplex DNA unwinding; protein homooligomerization; regulation of DNA-dependent DNA replication; cellular response to DNA damage stimulus; resolution of meiotic recombination intermediates; DNA synthesis involved in DNA repair; strand displacement; double-strand break repair via nonhomologous end joining; meiotic DNA double-strand break processing involved in reciprocal meiotic recombination; negative regulation of apoptotic process; double-strand break repair via synthesis-dependent strand annealing; negative regulation of mitotic recombination; alpha-beta T cell differentiation; positive regulation of alpha-beta T cell proliferation; meiotic chromosome separation; negative regulation of thymocyte apoptotic process; resolution of recombination intermediates; negative regulation of double-strand break repair via single-strand annealing; positive regulation of double-strand break repair via homologous recombination; regulation of signal transduction by p53 class mediator; telomere maintenance; DNA unwinding involved in DNA replication
Sources:Amigo / QuickGO
Orthologs
Databases	NCBI: entry; OMA: entry
Species	Human	Mouse
Entrez	641	12144
Ensembl	ENSG00000197299	ENSMUSG00000030528
UniProt	P54132	O88700
RefSeq (mRNA)	NM_000057; NM_001287246; NM_001287247; NM_001287248	NM_001042527; NM_007550
RefSeq (protein)	NP_000048; NP_001274175; NP_001274176; NP_001274177; NP_001274177.1	NP_001035992; NP_031576
Location (UCSC)	Chr 15: 90.72 – 90.82 Mb	Chr 7: 80.1 – 80.18 Mb
PubMed search
- Wikidata
View/Edit Human	View/Edit Mouse

Bloom syndrome protein is a protein that in humans is encoded by the BLM gene and is not expressed in Bloom syndrome.

The Bloom syndrome gene product is related to the RecQ subset of DExH box-containing DNA helicases and has both DNA-stimulated ATPase and ATP-dependent DNA helicase activities. Mutations causing Bloom syndrome delete or alter helicase motifs and may disable the 3' → 5' helicase activity. The normal protein may act to suppress inappropriate homologous recombination.

== Meiosis ==
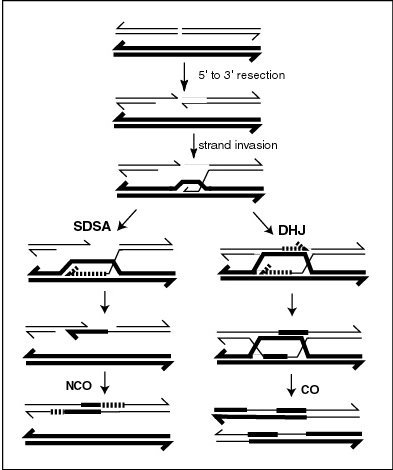
A current model of meiotic recombination, initiated by a double-strand break or gap, followed by pairing with an homologous chromosome and strand invasion to initiate the recombinational repair process. Repair of the gap can lead to crossover (CO) or non-crossover (NCO) of the flanking regions. CO recombination is thought to occur by the Double Holliday Junction (DHJ) model, illustrated on the right, above. NCO recombinants are thought to occur primarily by the Synthesis Dependent Strand Annealing (SDSA) model, illustrated on the left, above. Most recombination events appear to be the SDSA type.

Recombination during meiosis is often initiated by a DNA double-strand break (DSB). During recombination, sections of DNA at the 5' ends of the break are cut away in a process called resection. In the strand invasion step that follows, an overhanging 3' end of the broken DNA molecule then "invades" the DNA of an homologous chromosome that is not broken. After strand invasion, the further sequence of events may follow either of two main pathways leading to a crossover (CO) or a non-crossover (NCO) recombinant (see Genetic recombination and bottom of Figure in this section).

The budding yeast Saccharomyces cerevisiae encodes an ortholog of the Bloom syndrome (BLM) protein that is designated Sgs1 (Slow growth suppressor 1). Sgs1(BLM) is a helicase that functions in homologous recombinational repair of DSBs. The Sgs1(BLM) helicase appears to be a central regulator of most of the recombination events that occur during S. cerevisiae meiosis. During normal meiosis Sgs1(BLM) is responsible for directing recombination towards the alternate formation of either early NCOs or Holliday junction joint molecules, the latter being subsequently resolved as COs.

In the plant Arabidopsis thaliana, homologs of the Sgs1(BLM) helicase act as major barriers to meiotic CO formation. These helicases are thought to displace the invading strand allowing its annealing with the other 3’overhang end of the DSB, leading to NCO recombinant formation by a process called synthesis dependent strand annealing (SDSA) (see Genetic recombination and Figure in this section). It is estimated that only about 4% of DSBs are repaired by CO recombination. Sequela-Arnaud et al. suggested that CO numbers are restricted because of the long-term costs of CO recombination, that is, the breaking up of favorable genetic combinations of alleles built up by past natural selection.

== DNA repair and apoptosis ==
Bloom syndrome protein facilitates DNA repair when cells are stressed by agents that cause DNA damage, specifically when DNA replication forks are stalled. Damage present during S phase of the cell cycle causes Bloom syndrome protein to rapidly form foci with gamma H2AFX protein at replication forks that develop DNA breaks. These BLM foci then recruit repair complexes composed of BRCA1 and NBS1 proteins to the stalled replication forks. In addition to its role in repairing DNA damages, Bloom syndrome protein facilitates apoptosis (programmed cell death), a process dependent on p53 protein when cells are stressed by agents that cause unrepairable DNA damage, particularly damage that causes stalled DNA replication forks.

Both DNA repair and apoptosis are enzymatic processes necessary for maintaining genome integrity in humans. Cells that are deficient in DNA repair tend to accumulate DNA damages, and when such cells are also defective in apoptosis they tend to survive even though excessive DNA damage is present. Replication of DNA in such cells tends to lead to mutations and such mutations may cause cancer. Thus Bloom syndrome protein appears to have two roles related to the prevention of cancer, where the first role is to promote repair of a specific class of damages and the second role is to induce apoptosis if the level of such DNA damage is beyond the cell's repair capability.

== Interactions ==
Bloom syndrome protein has been shown to interact with:

- ATM,
- CHAF1A,
- CHEK1,
- FANCM,
- FEN1,
- H2AFX,
- MCM6
- MLH1
- P53,
- RAD51L3,
- RAD51,
- RPA1,
- TOP3A,
- TP53BP1,
- WRN, and
- XRCC2.
