= August von Rothmund =

German ophthalmologist (1830–1906)

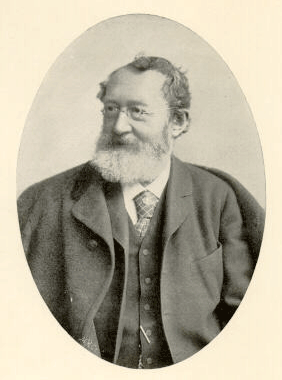
August von Rothmund

August von Rothmund (1 August 1830 – 27 October 1906) was a German ophthalmologist from Volkach, Lower Franconia.

In 1853, he received his doctorate from the Ludwig-Maximilians-Universität München, and furthered his studies at the Friedrich Wilhelm University of Berlin under Albrecht von Graefe (1828–1870); at Charles University in Prague with Carl Ferdinand von Arlt (1812–1887) and at the University of Vienna with Eduard Jäger von Jaxtthal (1818–1884). In 1854, he returned to Munich, where he became director of the surgical policlinic (Reisingerianum). In 1863, he was appointed "full professor", at the Ludwig-Maximilians-Universität München, where he practiced ophthalmology until his retirement in 1900. He was the son of noted surgeon Franz Christoph von Rothmund (1801–1891).

In 1868, Rothmund was the first physician to describe a rare hereditary oculocutaneous disease that consisted of telangiectasia, erythema, congenital cataracts and bone defects, along with other symptoms. This disorder was to become known as the Rothmund-Thomson Syndrome; named in conjunction with British physician Matthew Sydney Thomson FRSE (1894–1969).

== Written works ==
- Ueber Radical-Operation beweglicher Leistenbrüche. (Radical operation of inguinal hernia) Kaiser, Munich 1853.
- Ueber die Exarticulation des Unterkiefers. (Articulation of the lower jaw) Kaiser, Munich 1853. (Inaugural-Abhandlung)
- Beiträge zur künstlichen Pupillenbildung. (Concerning artificial pupil formation) Munich 1855.
- Ueber cataracten in Verbindung mit einer eigenthümlichen Hautdegeneration. (Cataracts in connection with persistent skin deterioration) In: Archiv für Ophtalmologie. 1868, Vol. 14, S. 159–82
- Ueber den gegenwärtigen Standpunkt der Lehre von den infectiösen Erkrankungen des Auges. (From the present standpoint involving the theory of eye infections) München 1881. (Vortrag)
- Mitteilungen aus der Universitäts-Augenklinik zu München. (Reports from the University Eye Clinic in Munich) Oldenbourg, Munich 1882.
- Casuistischer Beitrag zur Lehre von der Sogenannten Sympathischen Augenentzündung. (Casuisti contribution to the theory of sympathetic eye inflammation) Oldenbourg, München 1882.
- Einige Bemerkungen über die Anwendung des Sublimats. (Remarks about the usage of corrosive sublimate) M. Rieger, Munich 1883.
