= Mir-210 microRNA =

mir-210
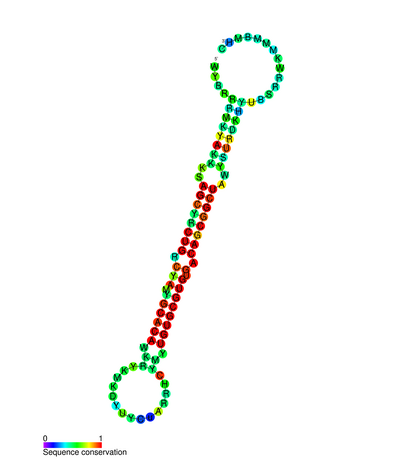
- Conserved secondary structure of mir-210

Identifiers
- Symbol: mir-210
- Rfam: RF00679
- miRBase family: MIPF0000086
- NCBI Gene: 406992
- HGNC: 31587
- OMIM: 612982

Other data
- RNA type: microRNA
- Domain(s): Eukaryota; Chordata
- PDB structures: PDBe

In molecular biology mir-210 microRNA is a short RNA molecule. MicroRNAs function to regulate the expression levels of other genes by several mechanisms.

mir-210 has been strongly linked with the hypoxia pathway, and is upregulated in response to Hypoxia-inducible factors. It is also overexpressed in cells affected by cardiac disease and tumours. MiRNA-210 in particular, has been studied for its effects in rescuing cardiac function after myocardial infarcts via the up-regulation of angiogenesis and inhibition of cardiomyocyte apoptosis.

== Myocardial infarction therapy ==
Myocardial infarction is cardiac tissue necrosis that results from occlusion of blood supply via coronary arteries, thereby starving cells of oxygen and nutrients (termed ischemia). Prolong ischemia will eventually kill the cells and the destruction of cardiac cells leads to tissue death, which can lead to heart failure.

Delivery of miRNA-210 to an ischemic heart improves heart function, possibly by promoting the release of angiogenic factors like interleukin-1α (IL-1α), tumor necrosis factor-α (TNF-α) and leptin, as seen in HL-1 cardiomyocytes injected with miRNA-210. However, miRNA-210 also targets the Efna3 and Ptp1b genes, which are genes which endogenously regulate angiogenesis and apoptosis, respectively.

Ephrin-A3 (Efna3) is a gene that is involved in the inhibition of angiogenesis. Although it is known that Efna3 inhibits the formation of new blood vessels, its specific role is still unknown. MiRNA-210 suppresses Efna3 at the mRNA level, thereby allowing angiogenesis to occur in cardiac tissue post-infarct.

The second target gene, protein tyrosine phosphatase-1B (Ptp1b) is involved in the induction of apoptosis. Ptp1b gene protein has been known to regulate apoptosis by regulating the phosphorylation status of apoptotic proteins such as caspase-3 and caspase-8. MiRNA-210 inhibits the effects of Ptp1b protein, which suppresses its pro-apoptotic functions. Therefore, suppression of these two particular genes may contribute to the improvement of cardiac tissue and function by up-regulating angiogenesis and inhibiting apoptosis of cardiomyocytes after myocardial infarct.

== Biomarker ==
=== Adrenocortical carcinoma ===
Mir-210 has been suggested as a useful biomarker to distinguish adrenocortical carcinoma from adrenocortical adenoma.

=== Breast cancer ===
mir-210 expression is associated with survival in breast cancer. Higher expression indicates lower probability for survival in patients with breast cancer.

== See also ==
- MicroRNA
