= FANCM =

Mammalian protein found in Homo sapiens

Identifiers
- Aliases: FANCM, FAAP250, KIAA1596, Fanconi anemia complementation group M, FA complementation group M, POF15, SPGF28
- External IDs: OMIM: 609644; MGI: 2442306; GeneCards: FANCM
Available structures
PDB	Ortholog search: PDBe RCSB
PDB	List of PDB id codes 4BXO, 4DAY, 4DRB, 4E45, 4M6W
Enzyme activity
EC #	BRENDA	ExPASy	KEGG	MetaCyc
3.6.4.13	↗	↗	↗	↗

Gene location (Human)
Chr.	Chromosome 14 (human)
Band	14q21.2	Start	45,135,930 bp
Band	14q21.2	End	45,200,890 bp

Gene location (Mouse)
Chr.	Chromosome 12 (mouse)
Band	12 C1|12 27.21 cM	Start	65,122,377 bp
Band	12 C1|12 27.21 cM	End	65,178,832 bp
RNA expression pattern
Bgee	Human / Mouse (ortholog); Top expressed in: sperm; oocyte; testicle; secondary oocyte; ventricular zone; gonad; right testis; left testis; Achilles tendon; ganglionic eminence / Top expressed in: tail of embryo; blastocyst; genital tubercle; morula; morula; zygote; secondary oocyte; epiblast; ventricular zone; spermatocyte; More reference expression data
BioGPS	n/a
Gene ontology
Molecular function	DNA binding; nuclease activity; nucleotide binding; chromatin binding; protein binding; ATP binding; hydrolase activity; helicase activity; 3'-5' DNA helicase activity
Cellular component	FANCM-MHF complex; Fanconi anaemia nuclear complex; nucleus; nucleoplasm
Biological process	resolution of meiotic recombination intermediates; interstrand cross-link repair; replication fork processing; nucleic acid phosphodiester bond hydrolysis; cellular response to DNA damage stimulus; DNA repair; DNA duplex unwinding; positive regulation of protein monoubiquitination
Sources:Amigo / QuickGO
Orthologs
Databases	NCBI: entry; OMA: entry
Species	Human	Mouse
Entrez	57697	104806
Ensembl	ENSG00000187790	ENSMUSG00000055884
UniProt	Q8IYD8	Q8BGE5
RefSeq (mRNA)	NM_001308133; NM_001308134; NM_020937	NM_178912; NM_001364447
RefSeq (protein)	NP_001295062; NP_001295063; NP_065988	NP_849243; NP_001351376
Location (UCSC)	Chr 14: 45.14 – 45.2 Mb	Chr 12: 65.12 – 65.18 Mb
PubMed search
- Wikidata
View/Edit Human	View/Edit Mouse

Fanconi anemia, complementation group M

Identifiers
- Symbol: FANCM
- Alt. symbols: KIAA1596
- NCBI gene: 57697
- HGNC: 23168
- OMIM: 609644
- PDB: 4BXO
- RefSeq: XM_048128
- UniProt: Q8IYD8

Other data
- EC number: 3.6.1.-
- Locus: Chr. 14 q21.3
Search for
- Structures: Swiss-model
- Domains: InterPro

Fanconi anemia, complementation group M, also known as FANCM, is a human gene. It is an emerging target in cancer therapy, in particular cancers with specific genetic deficiencies.

== Function ==
The protein encoded by this gene, FANCM displays DNA binding against fork structures and an ATPase activity associated with DNA branch migration. It is believed that FANCM in conjunction with other Fanconi anemia- proteins repair DNA at stalled replication forks, and stalled transcription structures called R-loops.

The structure of the C-terminus of FANCM (amino acids 1799-2048), bound to a partner protein FAAP24, reveals how the protein complex recognises branched DNA. A structure of amino acids 675-790 of FANCM reveal how the protein binds duplex DNA through a remodeling of the MHF1:MHF2 histone-like protein complex.

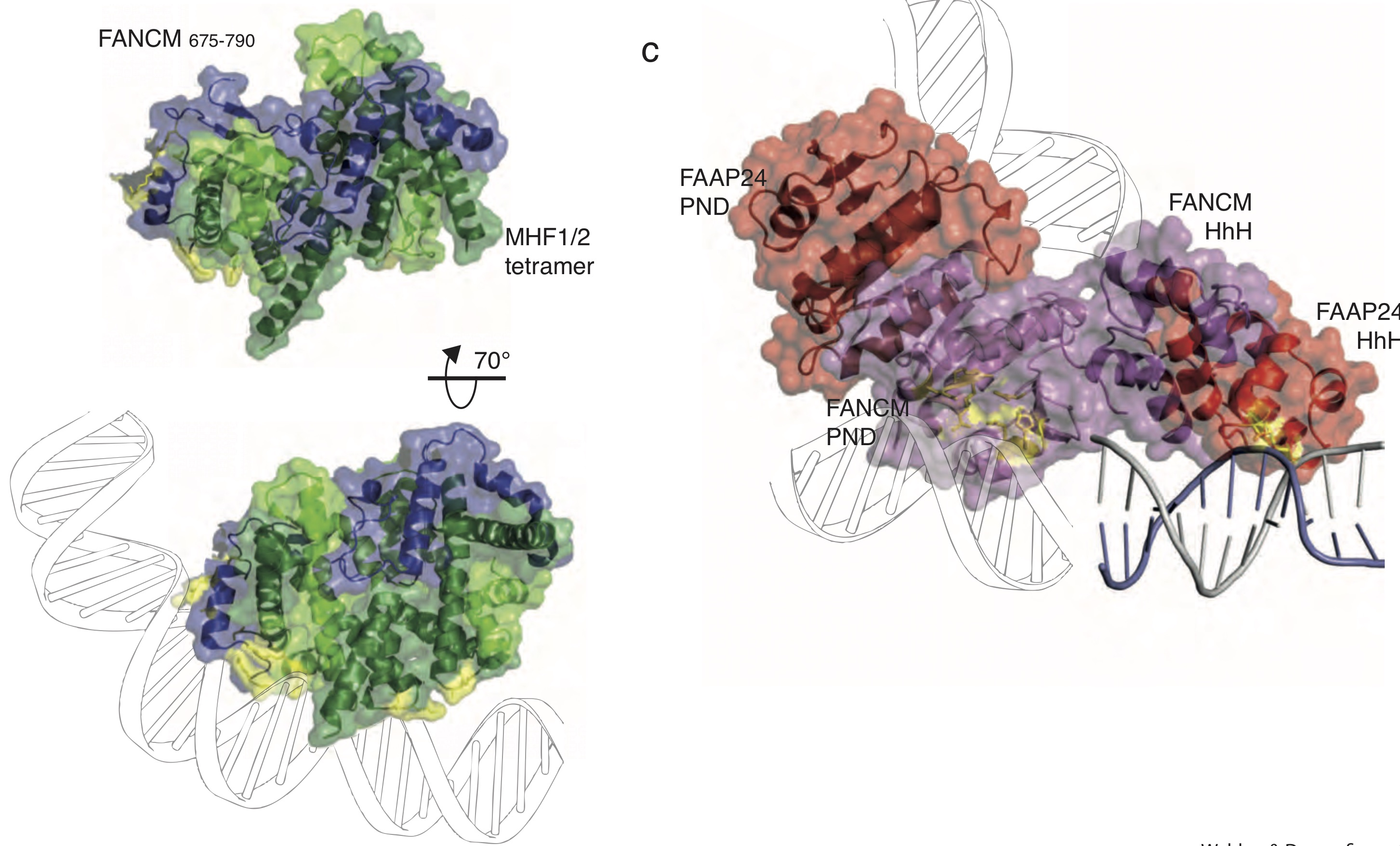
Mechanism by which FANCM interacts with DNA, determined by protein crystallography of DNA bound protein fragments

=== Meiosis ===
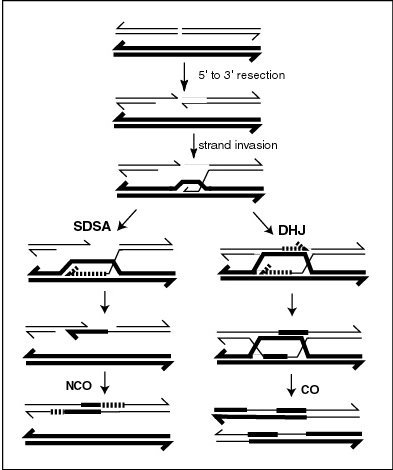
A current model of meiotic recombination, initiated by a double-strand break or gap, followed by pairing with an homologous chromosome and strand invasion to initiate the recombinational repair process. Repair of the gap can lead to crossover (CO) or non-crossover (NCO) of the flanking regions. CO recombination is thought to occur by the Double Holliday Junction (DHJ) model, illustrated on the right, above. NCO recombinants are thought to occur primarily by the Synthesis Dependent Strand Annealing (SDSA) model, illustrated on the left, above. Most recombination events appear to be the SDSA type.

Recombination during meiosis is often initiated by a DNA double-strand break (DSB). During recombination, sections of DNA at the 5' ends of the break are cut away in a process called resection. In the strand invasion step that follows, an overhanging 3' end of the broken DNA molecule then "invades" the DNA of a homologous chromosome that is not broken forming a displacement loop (D-loop). After strand invasion, the further sequence of events may follow either of two main pathways leading to a crossover (CO) or a non-crossover (NCO) recombinant (see Genetic recombination and Homologous recombination). The pathway leading to a NCO is referred to as synthesis dependent strand annealing (SDSA).

FANCM acts as a meiotic anti-crossover factor in mammals, limiting the number of crossovers during meiotic recombination. Deletion of the Fancm gene in mice leads to an increase in genome-wide crossover frequencies and perturbed gametogenesis, consistent with reproductive defects observed in humans with biallelic FANCM mutations.

In the plant Arabidopsis thaliana FANCM helicase antagonizes the formation of CO recombinants during meiosis, thus favoring NCO recombinants. The FANCM helicase is required for genome stability in humans and yeast, and is a major factor limiting meiotic CO formation in A. thaliana. A pathway involving another helicase, RECQ4A/B, also acts independently of FANCM to reduce CO recombination. These two pathways likely act by unwinding different joint molecule substrates (e.g. nascent versus extended D-loops; see Figure).

Only about 4% of DSBs in A. thaliana are repaired by CO recombination; the remaining 96% are likely repaired mainly by NCO recombination. Sequela-Arnaud et al. suggested that CO numbers are restricted because of the long-term costs of CO recombination, that is, the breaking up of favorable genetic combinations of alleles built up by past natural selection.

In the fission yeast Schizosaccharomyces pombe, FANCM helicase also directs NCO recombination during meiosis.

== Clinical significance ==
=== Disease association ===
Bi-allelic mutations in the FANCM gene were originally associated with Fanconi anemia, although several individuals with FANCM deficiency do not appear to have the disorder. Mono-allelic FANCM mutations are associated with breast cancer risk and especially with risk of developing ER-negative and TNBC disease subtypes. A founder mutation in the Scandinavian population is also associated with a higher than average frequency of triple negative breast cancer in heterozygous carriers. FANCM carriers also have elevated levels of Ovarian cancer and other solid tumours

=== As a drug target ===
Expression and activity of FANCM, is essential for the viability of cancers using Alternative Lengthening of Telomeres (ALT-associated cancers). Several other synthetic lethal interactions have been observed for FANCM that may widen the targetability of the protein in therapeutic use.

There are several potential ways in which FANCM activity could be targeted as an anti-cancer agent. In the context of ALT, one of the best targets may be a peptide domain of FANCM called MM2. Ectopic MM2 peptide (that acts as a dominant decoy) was sufficient to inhibit colony formation of ALT-associated cancer cells, but not telomerase-positive cancer cells. This peptide works as a dominant interfering binder to RMI1:RMI2, and sequesters another DNA repair complex called the Bloom Syndrome complex away from FANCM. As with FANCM depletion, this induces death through a "hyper-ALT" phenotype. An in vitro high-throughput screen for small molecule inhibitors of MM2-RMI1:2 interaction lead to the discovery of PIP-199. This experimental drug also showed some discriminatory activity in killing of ALT-cells, compared to telomerase-positive cells.
