= Franz Christoph von Rothmund =

German surgeon (1801–1891)

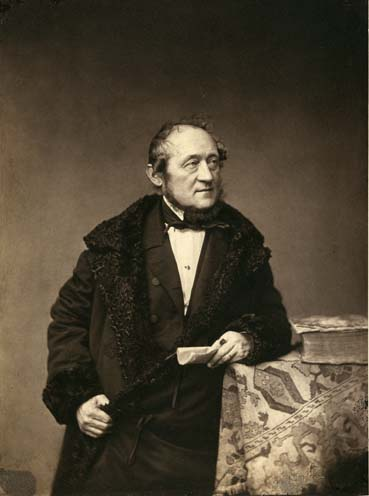
Franz Christoph von Rothmund (1801-1891)

Franz Christoph von Rothmund (28 December 1801, Dettelbach, Germany – 30 November 1891, Munich, Germany) was a German surgeon. He was the father of ophthalmologist August von Rothmund (1830–1906).

He studied medicine with Ignaz Döllinger (1770–1841), Cajetan von Textor (1782–1860) and Johann Lukas Schönlein (1793–1864) at the University of Würzburg, and under Karl Ferdinand von Gräfe (1787–1840) at the Friedrich Wilhelm University of Berlin.

From 1823, he served as court physician in Miltenberg, later performing similar duties in Volkach. In 1843, he became a professor at the Ludwig-Maximilians-Universität München, later attaining the title of Obermedicinalrath.

Rothmund is known for his work involving "radical surgery" of hernias. He retired from medicine in 1871, and at the time of his death was considered the "doyen of German surgeons".

== Written works ==
- Dissertatio inauguralis de oscitatione, 1824
- Ueber Radical-Operation beweglicher Leistenbrüche : mit 8 Kupfertafeln, 1853.
