= Werner syndrome helicase =

Enzyme found in humans

WRN
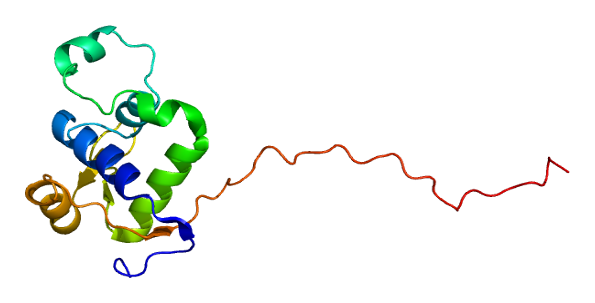

Identifiers
- Aliases: WRN, RECQ3, RECQL2, RECQL3, Werner syndrome RecQ like helicase, WRN RecQ like helicase
- External IDs: OMIM: 604611; MGI: 109635; GeneCards: WRN
Available structures
PDB	Ortholog search: PDBe RCSB
PDB	List of PDB id codes 2AXL, 2DGZ, 2E1E, 2E1F, 2FBT, 2FBV, 2FBX, 2FBY, 2FC0, 3AAF
Enzyme activity
EC #	BRENDA	ExPASy	KEGG	MetaCyc
5.6.2.4	↗	↗	↗	↗

Gene location (Human)
Chr.	Chromosome 8 (human)
Band	8p12	Start	31,033,788 bp
Band	8p12	End	31,176,138 bp

Gene location (Mouse)
Chr.	Chromosome 8 (mouse)
Band	8 A3|8 20.3 cM	Start	33,724,412 bp
Band	8 A3|8 20.3 cM	End	33,875,555 bp
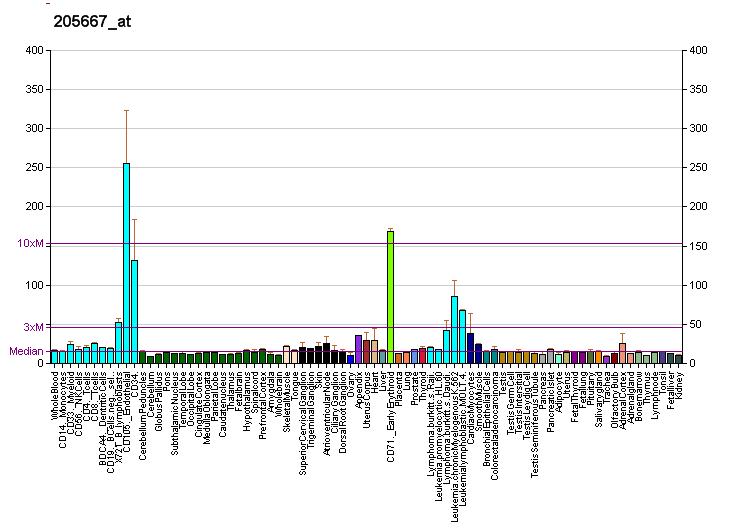
RNA expression pattern
Bgee	Human / Mouse (ortholog); Top expressed in: Achilles tendon; sperm; testicle; epithelium of colon; gonad; gastric mucosa; secondary oocyte; body of uterus; sural nerve; ventricular zone / Top expressed in: tail of embryo; zygote; spermatid; secondary oocyte; granulocyte; fetal liver hematopoietic progenitor cell; spermatocyte; lumbar spinal ganglion; cumulus cell; genital tubercle; More reference expression data
BioGPS	More reference expression data
Gene ontology
Molecular function	DNA binding; nucleotide binding; manganese ion binding; protein homodimerization activity; helicase activity; DNA helicase activity; bubble DNA binding; chromatin binding; metal ion binding; G-quadruplex DNA binding; ATPase activity; protein binding; catalytic activity; 3'-5' exonuclease activity; Y-form DNA binding; nucleic acid binding; nuclease activity; 3'-5' DNA helicase activity; four-way junction helicase activity; ATP binding; magnesium ion binding; hydrolase activity; exonuclease activity; telomeric D-loop binding; 3'-flap-structured DNA binding; four-way junction DNA binding; forked DNA-dependent helicase activity; telomeric G-quadruplex DNA binding; 8-hydroxy-2'-deoxyguanosine DNA binding; protein-containing complex binding; MutLalpha complex binding
Cellular component	centrosome; intracellular anatomical structure; nucleoplasm; nucleolus; neuron projection; MutLalpha complex; nucleus; cytoplasm; nuclear speck; telomere; replication fork; DNA replication factor A complex; chromosome; site of double-strand break
Biological process	regulation of apoptotic process; positive regulation of hydrolase activity; DNA recombination; cellular response to starvation; DNA metabolic process; ageing; response to oxidative stress; cellular response to DNA damage stimulus; regulation of growth rate; brain development; cell metabolism; cellular response to gamma radiation; replication fork processing; multicellular organism aging; metabolism; nucleobase-containing compound metabolic process; response to UV-C; base-excision repair; double-strand break repair; DNA repair; nucleic acid phosphodiester bond hydrolysis; double-strand break repair via homologous recombination; DNA duplex unwinding; DNA replication; telomeric D-loop disassembly; t-circle formation; positive regulation of strand invasion; telomere maintenance; G-quadruplex DNA unwinding; protein localization to nucleolus; DNA synthesis involved in DNA repair; determination of adult lifespan; regulation of signal transduction by p53 class mediator; DNA unwinding involved in DNA replication
Sources:Amigo / QuickGO
Orthologs
Databases	NCBI: entry; OMA: entry
Species	Human	Mouse
Entrez	7486	22427
Ensembl	ENSG00000165392	ENSMUSG00000031583
UniProt	Q14191	O09053
RefSeq (mRNA)	NM_000553	NM_001122822; NM_011721
RefSeq (protein)	NP_000544	NP_001116294; NP_035851
Location (UCSC)	Chr 8: 31.03 – 31.18 Mb	Chr 8: 33.72 – 33.88 Mb
PubMed search
- Wikidata
View/Edit Human	View/Edit Mouse

Werner syndrome ATP-dependent helicase, also known as DNA helicase, RecQ-like type 3, is an enzyme that in humans is encoded by the WRN gene. WRN is a member of the RecQ Helicase family. Helicase enzymes generally unwind and separate double-stranded DNA. These activities are necessary before DNA can be copied in preparation for cell division (DNA replication). Helicase enzymes are also critical for making a blueprint of a gene for protein production, a process called transcription. Further evidence suggests that Werner protein plays a critical role in repairing DNA. Overall, this protein helps maintain the structure and integrity of a person's DNA.

The WRN gene is located on the short (p) arm of chromosome 8 between positions 12 and 11.2, from base pair 31,010,319 to base pair 31,150,818.

== Structure ==
WRN is a member of the RecQ Helicase family. It is the only RecQ Helicase that contains 3' to 5' exonuclease activity. WRN is an oligomer that can act as a monomer when unwinding DNA, but as a dimer in solution or a tetramer when complexed with DNA, and has also been observed in hexameric forms. The diffusion of WRN has been measured to 1.62 $\tfrac{\mathrm{\mu m}^2}{\mathrm{s}}$ in nucleoplasm and 0.12 $\textstyle \tfrac{\mathrm{\mu m}^2}{\mathrm{s}}$ at nucleoli.

Orthologs of WRN have been found in a number of other organisms, including Drosophila, Xenopus, and C. elegans. The amino terminus of WRN is involved in both helicase and nuclease activities, while the carboxyl-terminus interacts with p53, an important tumor suppressor. mRNA that codes for WRN has been identified in most human tissues.

=== Post-translational modification ===
Phosphorylation of WRN at serine/threonine inhibits helicase and exonuclease activities which are important to post-replication DNA repair. De-phosphorylation at these sites enhances the catalytic activities of WRN. Phosphorylation may affect other post-translational modifications, including SUMOylation and acetylation. Upon its inhibition by a small molecule in cancer cells harboring a high number of microsatellites (MSI-H), WRN becomes SUMOylated, which leads to is ubiquitylation and subsequent degradation.

Methylation of WRN causes the gene to turn off. This suppresses the production of the WRN protein and its functions in DNA repair.

== Function ==
The exonuclease activities of WRN include degradation of recessed 3' ends and initiation of DNA degradation from a gap in dsDNA. WRN is important in repair of double strand breaks by homologous recombination or non-homologous end joining, repair of single nucleotide damages by base excision repair, and is effective in replication arrest recovery.

WRN may also be important in telomere maintenance and replication, especially the replication of the G-rich sequences.

WRN may function as an exonuclease in DNA repair, recombination, or replication, as well as resolution of DNA secondary structures. It is involved in branch migration at Holliday junctions, and it interacts with other DNA replication intermediates. WRN is important to genome stability, and cells with mutations to WRN are more susceptible to DNA damage and DNA breaks.

=== Homologous recombinational repair ===
WRN is active in homologous recombination. Cells defective in the WRN gene have a 23-fold reduction in spontaneous mitotic recombination, with especial deficiency in conversion-type events. WRN defective cells, when exposed to x-rays, have more chromosome breaks and micronuclei than cells with wild-type WRN. Cells defective in the WRN gene are not more sensitive than wild-type cells to gamma-irradiation, UV light, 4 – 6 cyclobutane pyrimidines, or mitomycin C, but are sensitive to type I and type II topoisomerase inhibitors. These findings suggested that the WRN protein takes part in homologous recombinational repair and in the processing of stalled replication forks.

=== Non-homologous end joining ===
WRN has an important role in non-homologous end joining (NHEJ) DNA repair. As shown by Shamanna et al., WRN is recruited to double-strand breaks (DSBs) and participates in NHEJ with its enzymatic and non-enzymatic functions. At DSBs, in association with Ku (protein), it promotes standard or canonical NHEJ (c-NHEJ), repairing double-strand breaks in DNA with its enzymatic functions and with a fair degree of accuracy. WRN inhibits an alternative form of NHEJ, called alt-NHEJ or microhomology-mediated end joining (MMEJ). MMEJ is an inaccurate mode of repair for double-strand breaks.

=== Base excision repair ===
WRN has a role in base excision repair (BER) of DNA. As shown by Das et al., WRN associates with NEIL1 in the early damage-sensing step of BER. WRN stimulates NEIL1 in excision of oxidative lesions. NEIL1 is a DNA glycosylase that initiates the first step in BER by cleaving bases damaged by reactive oxygen species (ROS) and introducing a DNA strand break via NEIL1's associated lyase activity. NEIL1 recognizes (targets) and removes certain ROS-damaged bases and then incises the abasic site via β,δ elimination, leaving 3′ and 5′ phosphate ends. NEIL1 recognizes oxidized pyrimidines, formamidopyrimidines, thymine residues oxidized at the methyl group, and both stereoisomers of thymine glycol.

WRN also participates in BER through its interaction with Polλ. WRN binds to the catalytic domain of Polλ and specifically stimulates DNA gap filling by Polλ over 8-oxo-G followed by strand displacement synthesis. This allows WRN to promote long-patch DNA repair synthesis by Polλ during MUTYH-initiated repair of 8-oxo-G:A mispairs.

=== Replication arrest recovery ===
WRN is also involved in replication arrest recovery. If WRN is defective, replication arrest results in accumulation of DSBs and enhanced chromosome fragmentation. As shown by Pichierri et al., WRN interacts with the RAD9-RAD1-HUS1 (9.1.1) complex, one of the central factors of the replication checkpoint. This interaction is mediated by the binding of the RAD1 subunit to the N-terminal region of WRN and is instrumental for WRN relocalization to nuclear foci and its phosphorylation in response to replication arrest. (In the absence of DNA damage or replication fork stalling, WRN protein remains localized to the nucleoli.) The interaction of WRN with the 9.1.1 complex results in prevention of DSB formation at stalled replication forks.

=== Apoptosis ===
The p53 protein and WRN helicase engage in direct protein-protein interaction. Increased cellular WRN levels elicit increased cellular p53 levels and also potentiate p53-mediated apoptosis. This finding suggests that WRN helicase participates in the activation of p53 in response to certain types of DNA damage. p53-mediated apoptosis is attenuated in cells from patients with Werner syndrome.

Both repair of DNA damage and apoptosis are enzymatic processes necessary for maintaining integrity of the genome in humans. Cells with insufficient DNA repair tend to accumulate DNA damages, and when such cells are also defective in apoptosis they tend to survive even though excessive DNA damages are present. Replication of DNA in such deficient cells tends to lead to mutations and such mutations may cause cancer. Thus Werner syndrome helicase appears to have two roles related to the prevention of cancer, where the first role is to promote repair of specific types of damage and the second role is to induce apoptosis if the level of such DNA damage is beyond the cell's repair capability

== Clinical significance ==
=== Werner syndrome ===
Werner syndrome is caused by mutations in the WRN gene. More than 20 mutations in the WRN gene are known to cause Werner syndrome. Many of these mutations result in an abnormally shortened Werner protein. Evidence suggests that the altered protein is not transported into the cell nucleus, where it normally interacts with DNA. This shortened protein may also be broken down too quickly, leading to a loss of Werner protein in the cell. Without normal Werner protein in the nucleus, cells cannot perform the tasks of DNA replication, repair, and transcription. Researchers are still determining how these mutations cause the appearance of premature aging seen in Werner syndrome.

=== Cancer ===
==== Microsatellite instability ====
Recently, WRN has been identified as a synthetic lethality target in cancers containing a high number of microsatellites. These microsatellite-high (MSI-H) cancers have defects in their mismatch repair machinery (dMMR), which leads to the expansion of (TA)n dinucleotide repeats in the genome. These expanded (TA) dinucleotide microsatellites lead to the formation of secondary DNA structures (e.g. G-quadruplex) and rely on WRN to repair these bulky lesions. Because of this therapeutic hypothesis, inhibition of WRN has become an area of high interest for targeted therapies of MSI-H cancers, especially those that do not respond to immune checkpoint inhibition or chemotherapy.

==== Deficiencies ====
Cells expressing limiting amounts of WRN have elevated mutation frequencies compared with wildtype cells. Increased mutation may give rise to cancer. Patients with Werner Syndrome, with homozygous mutations in the WRN gene, have an increased incidence of cancers, including soft tissue sarcomas, osteosarcoma, thyroid cancer and melanoma.

Mutations in WRN are rare in the general population. The rate of heterozygous loss-of-function mutation in WRN is approximately one per million. In a Japanese population the rate is 6 per 1,000, which is higher, but still infrequent.

Mutational defects in the WRN gene are relatively rare in cancer cells compared to the frequency of epigenetic alterations in WRN that reduce WRN expression and could contribute to carcinogenesis. The situation is similar to other DNA repair genes whose expression is reduced in cancers due to mainly epigenetic alterations rather than mutations (see Frequencies of epimutations in DNA repair genes).

The table shows results of analysis of 630 human primary tumors for WRN CpG island hypermethylation. This hypermethylation caused reduced protein expression of WRN, a common event in tumorigenesis.

Frequency of WRN promoter methylation in sporadic cancers
Cancer	Frequency of reduction in cancer
Colorectal cancer	37.9%
Non-small cell lung cancer	37.5%
Gastric cancer	25%
Prostate cancer	20%
Breast cancer	17.2%
Thyroid cancer	12.5%
Non-Hodgkin lymphoma	23.7%
Acute myeloblastic leukemia	4.8%
Chondrosarcomas	33.3%
Osteosarcomas	11.1%

== Interactions ==
Werner syndrome ATP-dependent helicase has been shown to interact with:

- BLM
- DNA-PKcs,
- FEN1,
- Ku70,
- Ku80,
- P53,
- PCNA,
- TERF2,
- WRNIP1,
- RNF4, and
- PIAS4.

== Inhibitors ==
- VVD-214
