= RECQL5 =

Protein-coding gene in the species Homo sapiens

Identifiers
- Aliases: RECQL5, RECQ5, RecQ like helicase 5
- External IDs: OMIM: 603781; MGI: 2156841; GeneCards: RECQL5
Available structures
| PDB | Ortholog search: PDBe RCSB |
| PDB | List of PDB id codes 4BK0, 5LB8, 5LB5, 5LBA, 5LB3 |
Enzyme activity
| EC # | BRENDA | ExPASy | KEGG | MetaCyc |
|---|---|---|---|---|
| 5.6.2.4 | ↗ | ↗ | ↗ | ↗ |

Gene location (Human)
| Chr. | Chromosome 17 (human) |
| Band | 17q25.1 | Start | 75,626,845 bp |
| Band | 17q25.1 | End | 75,667,189 bp |

Gene location (Mouse)
| Chr. | Chromosome 11 (mouse) |
| Band | 11|11 E2 | Start | 115,783,421 bp |
| Band | 11|11 E2 | End | 115,824,303 bp |
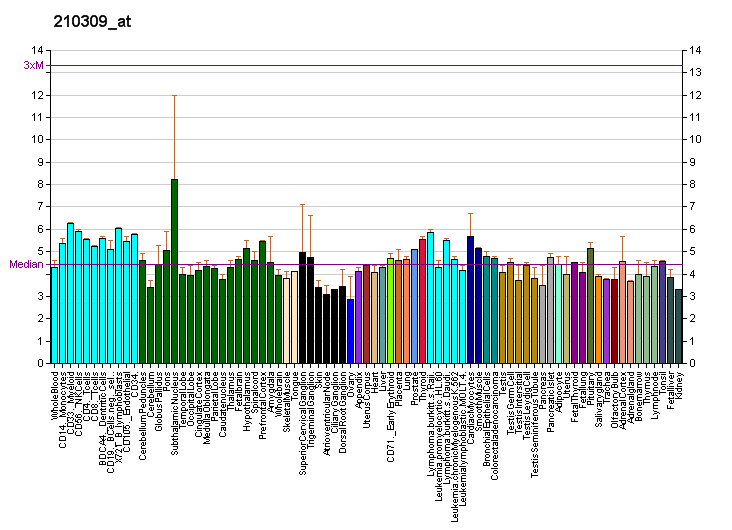

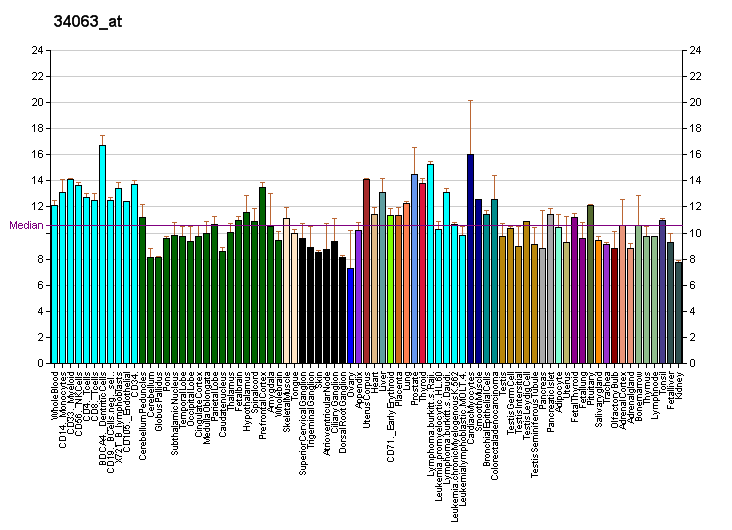

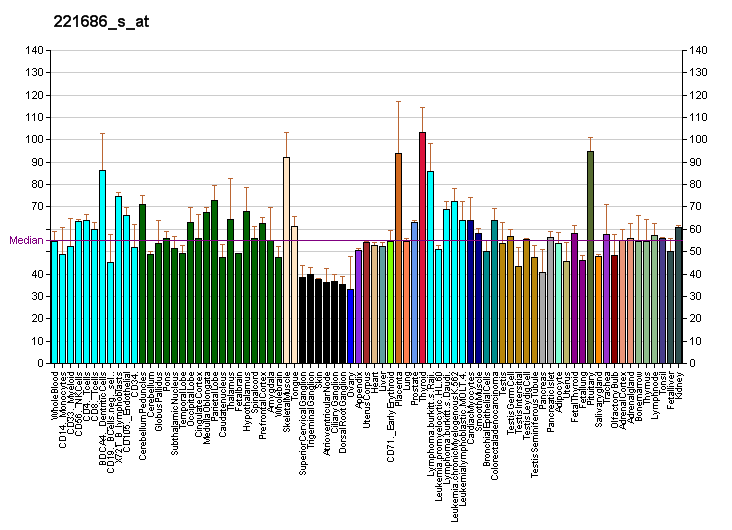
RNA expression pattern
| Bgee | Human / Mouse (ortholog); Top expressed in: right lobe of thyroid gland; right uterine tube; left lobe of thyroid gland; left testis; anterior pituitary; right testis; sural nerve; skin of abdomen; body of stomach; skin of leg / Top expressed in: granulocyte; zygote; spermatid; neural layer of retina; secondary oocyte; lip; tail of embryo; corneal stroma; ventricular zone; plantaris muscle; More reference expression data |
| BioGPS | More reference expression data |
Gene ontology
| Molecular function | RNA polymerase II complex binding; nucleotide binding; helicase activity; DNA helicase activity; nucleic acid binding; hydrolase activity; ATP binding; DNA binding; 3'-5' DNA helicase activity; four-way junction helicase activity; protein binding; identical protein binding |
| Cellular component | RNA polymerase II, holoenzyme; nucleoplasm; nucleus; chromosome; cytoplasm; cytosol |
| Biological process | DNA recombination; DNA metabolic process; negative regulation of transcription elongation from RNA polymerase II promoter; cellular response to DNA damage stimulus; cell division; chromosome separation; DNA replication; cell cycle; DNA repair; DNA duplex unwinding; double-strand break repair via homologous recombination; cellular response to camptothecin; replication-born double-strand break repair via sister chromatid exchange; negative regulation of double-strand break repair via homologous recombination; mitotic cell cycle; mitotic sister chromatid segregation; response to X-ray; negative regulation of mitotic cell cycle; DNA unwinding involved in DNA replication; metabolism |
Sources:Amigo / QuickGO
Orthologs
| Databases | NCBI: entry; OMA: entry |
| Species | Human | Mouse |
| Entrez | 9400 | 170472 |
| Ensembl | ENSG00000108469 | ENSMUSG00000020752 |
| UniProt | O94762 | Q8VID5 |
| RefSeq (mRNA) | NM_001003715; NM_001003716; NM_004259 | NM_130454 |
| RefSeq (protein) | NP_001003715; NP_001003716; NP_004250 | NP_569721 |
| Location (UCSC) | Chr 17: 75.63 – 75.67 Mb | Chr 11: 115.78 – 115.82 Mb |
| PubMed search |
- Wikidata
| View/Edit Human | View/Edit Mouse |

ATP-dependent DNA helicase Q5 is an enzyme that in humans is encoded by the RECQL5 gene.

== Interactions ==
RECQL5 has been shown to interact with EEF1G.
