= Sgs1 =

Sgs1, also known as slow growth suppressor 1, is a DNA helicase protein found in Saccharomyces cerevisiae. It is a homolog of the bacterial RecQ helicase. Like the other members of the RecQ helicase family, Sgs1 is important for DNA repair. In particular, Sgs1 collaborates with other proteins to repair double-strand breaks during homologous recombination in eukaryotes.

== Meiosis ==
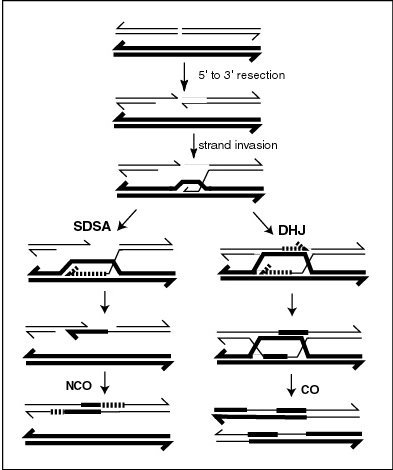
A current model of meiotic recombination, initiated by a double-strand break or gap, followed by pairing with an homologous chromosome and strand invasion to initiate the recombinational repair process. Repair of the gap can lead to crossover (CO) or non-crossover (NCO) of the flanking regions. CO recombination is thought to occur by the Double Holliday Junction (DHJ) model, illustrated on the right, above. NCO recombinants are thought to occur primarily by the Synthesis Dependent Strand Annealing (SDSA) model, illustrated on the left, above. Most recombination events appear to be the SDSA type.

The Sgs1(BLM) helicase is an ortholog of the human Bloom syndrome protein. It appears to be a central regulator of most of the recombination events that occur during S. cerevisiae meiosis. During normal meiosis Sgs1(BLM) is responsible for directing recombination towards the alternate formation of either early non-crossover recombinants (NCOs) or Holliday junction joint molecules, the latter being subsequently resolved as crossovers (COs) (see Figure). The several roles of Sgs1 in meiotic recombination were reviewed by Klein and Symington. Primarily, Sgs1 displaces the strand invasion intermediate that initiates recombination, thus facilitating NCO recombination (see Homologous recombination and Bloom syndrome protein).

Sgs1 also has a role in a pathway leading to CO recombinants. Sgs1 together with EXO1 and MLH1-MLH3 heterodimer (MutL gamma) define a joint molecule resolution pathway that produces the majority of crossovers in budding yeast, and by inference, in mammals.
