= Rothmund–Thomson syndrome =

Rare autosomal recessive skin condition

- Other names: Poikiloderma atrophicans with cataract or Poikiloderma congenitale
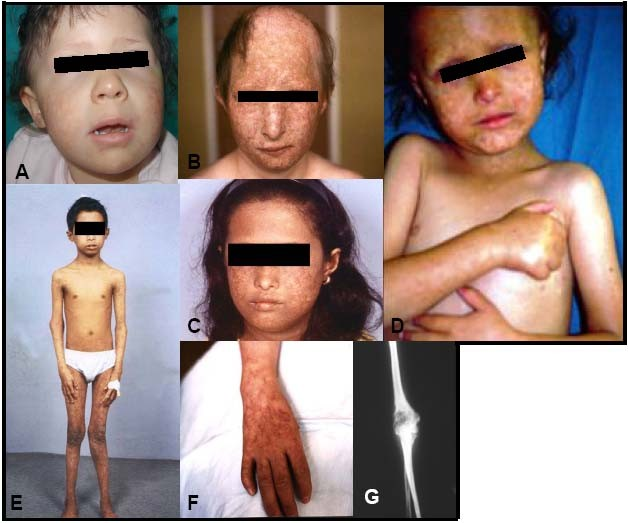
- Panel showing some clinical features of the RTS syndrome. A) Chronic phase of cheek poikiloderma (4-year-old girl). B) Poikiloderma with alopecia (21-year-old boy). C) Poikiloderma. D) Poikiloderma sparing the trunk (courtesy of Professor M. Paradisi, Rome). E) Photo distributed poikiloderma and valgism of the knees. F) Thumb aplasia (patient B). G) Bone defect seen by X-Rays: cystic-like destructive lesion of the humerus (distal epiphysis) without apparent solution of continuity of the cortical bone (patient E).
- Specialty: Medical genetics

Rothmund–Thomson syndrome (RTS) is a rare autosomal recessive skin condition.

There have been several reported cases associated with osteosarcoma. A hereditary basis, mutations in the DNA helicase RECQL4 gene, causing problems during initiation of DNA replication has been implicated in the syndrome.

== Signs and symptoms ==
- Sun-sensitive rash with prominent poikiloderma and telangiectasias
- Juvenile cataracts
- Saddle nose
- Congenital bone defects, including short stature and radial ray anomalies such as absent thumbs
- Hair growth problems (absent eyelashes, eyebrows and/or hair)
- Hypogonadism has not been well documented
- Hypodontia
- Calcium problems (not documented in journals)
- Ear problems (not documented in journals but identified by patients in support groups)
- Produces osteosarcoma

The skin is normal at birth. Between 3 and 6 months of age, the affected carrier develops poikiloderma on the cheeks. This characteristic "rash" that all RTS carriers have can develop on the arms, legs and buttocks. "Poikiloderma consists of areas of increased and decreased pigmentation, prominent blood vessels, and thinning of the skin."

=== Accelerated aging ===
In humans, individuals with RTS, and carrying the RECQL4 germline mutation, can have several clinical features of accelerated aging. These features include atrophic skin and pigment changes, alopecia, osteopenia, cataracts and an increased incidence of cancer. Also in mice, RECQL4 mutants show features of accelerated aging.

== Causes ==
Rothmund–Thomson syndrome has an autosomal recessive pattern of inheritance.

RTS is caused by a mutation of the RECQL4 gene, located at chromosome 8q24.3. The disorder is inherited in an autosomal recessive manner. This means the defective gene responsible for the disorder is located on an autosome (chromosome 8 is an autosome), and two copies of the defective gene (one inherited from each parent) are required in order to be born with the disorder. The parents of an individual with an autosomal recessive disorder both carry one copy of the defective gene, but usually do not experience any signs or symptoms of the disorder.

=== DNA repair ===
RECQL4 has a crucial role in DNA end resection that is the initial step required for homologous recombination (HR)-dependent double-strand break repair. When RECQL4 is depleted, HR-mediated repair and 5' end resection are severely reduced in vivo. RECQL4 also appears to be necessary for other forms of DNA repair including non-homologous end joining, nucleotide excision repair and base excision repair. The association of deficient RECQL4-mediated DNA repair with accelerated aging is consistent with the DNA damage theory of aging.

== History ==
The condition was originally described by August von Rothmund (1830–1906) in 1868. Matthew Sydney Thomson (1894–1969) published further descriptions in 1936.

== See also ==
- Poikiloderma vasculare atrophicans
- List of cutaneous conditions
- List of radiographic findings associated with cutaneous conditions
