= Fanconi anemia group I protein =

Protein-coding gene in the species Homo sapiens

FANCI

Identifiers
- Aliases: FANCI, KIAA1794, Fanconi anemia complementation group I, FA complementation group I
- External IDs: OMIM: 611360; MGI: 2384790; GeneCards: FANCI

Gene location (Human)
Chr.	Chromosome 15 (human)
Band	15q26.1	Start	89,243,945 bp
Band	15q26.1	End	89,317,261 bp

Gene location (Mouse)
Chr.	Chromosome 7 (mouse)
Band	7|7 D2	Start	79,041,677 bp
Band	7|7 D2	End	79,100,012 bp
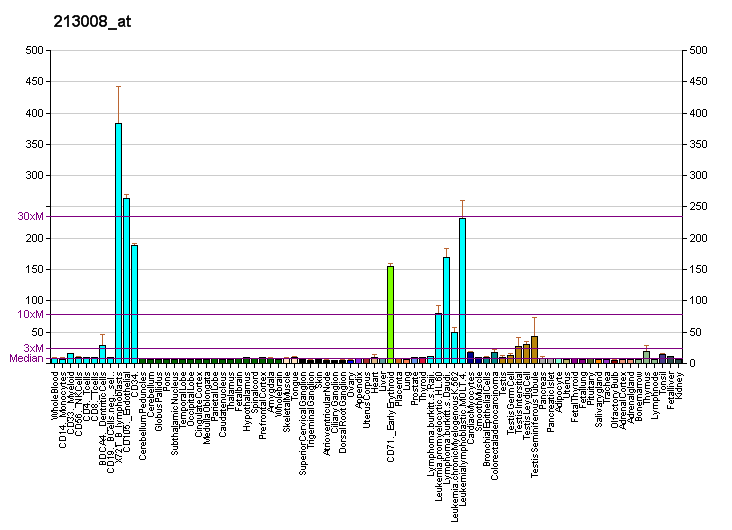

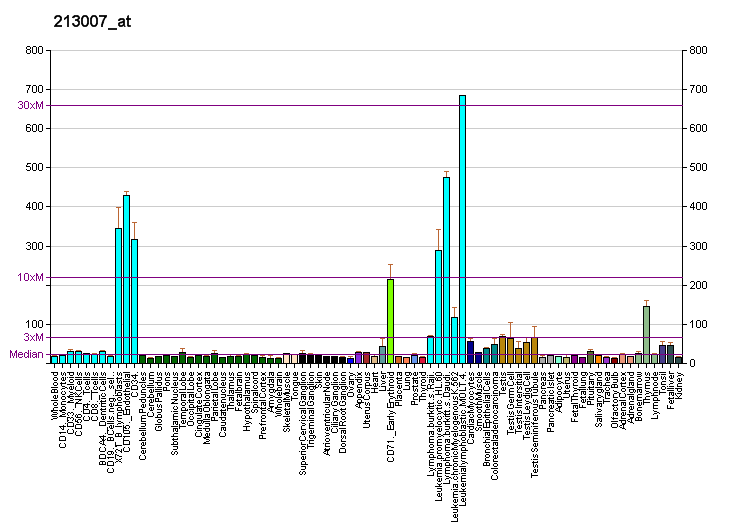
RNA expression pattern
Bgee	Human / Mouse (ortholog); Top expressed in: ventricular zone; secondary oocyte; testicle; ganglionic eminence; right testis; left testis; gonad; bone marrow cell; rectum; trabecular bone / Top expressed in: otic vesicle; otic placode; spermatocyte; saccule; spermatid; fetal liver hematopoietic progenitor cell; primary oocyte; secondary oocyte; epiblast; zygote; More reference expression data
BioGPS	More reference expression data
Gene ontology
Molecular function	DNA binding; protein binding; DNA polymerase binding
Cellular component	membrane; nucleus; nucleoplasm; cytosol
Biological process	cell cycle; mitotic G2 DNA damage checkpoint signaling; positive regulation of protein ubiquitination; interstrand cross-link repair; cellular response to DNA damage stimulus; DNA repair
Sources:Amigo / QuickGO
Orthologs
Databases	NCBI: entry; OMA: entry
Species	Human	Mouse
Entrez	55215	208836
Ensembl	ENSG00000140525	ENSMUSG00000039187
UniProt	Q9NVI1	Q8K368
RefSeq (mRNA)	NM_001113378; NM_018193; NM_001376910; NM_001376911	NM_145946
RefSeq (protein)	NP_001106849; NP_060663; NP_001363839; NP_001363840	NP_666058
Location (UCSC)	Chr 15: 89.24 – 89.32 Mb	Chr 7: 79.04 – 79.1 Mb
PubMed search
- Wikidata
View/Edit Human	View/Edit Mouse

Fanconi anemia group I protein (FANCI) also known as KIAA1794, is a protein which in humans is encoded by the FANCI gene. Mutations in the FANCI gene are known to cause Fanconi anemia.

== Function ==
The Fanconi anemia complementation group (FANC) currently includes FANCA, FANCB, FANCC, FANCD1 (also called BRCA2), FANCD2, FANCE, FANCF, FANCG, FANCI, FANCJ (also called BRIP1), FANCL, FANCM and FANCN (also called PALB2). The previously defined group FANCH is the same as FANCA. Fanconi anemia is a genetically heterogeneous recessive disorder characterized by cytogenetic instability, hypersensitivity to DNA crosslinking agents, increased chromosomal breakage, and defective DNA repair. The members of the Fanconi anemia complementation group do not share sequence similarity; they are related by their assembly into a common nuclear protein complex. This gene encodes the protein for complementation group I. Alternative splicing results in two transcript variants encoding different isoforms.

FANCI forms a heterodimer with FANCD2 protein. Both FANCD2 and FANCI are monoubiquitinated by the Fanconi anemia core complex subunit FANCL. FANCI monoubiquitination is essential for repairing DNA interstrand crosslinks, and clamps the protein on DNA together with its partner protein FANCD2. The monoubiquitinated FANCD2:FANCI complex coats DNA in a filament-like array, potentially as a way to protect DNA associated with stalled replication.

In addition to proteins involved in DNA repair, FANCI interacts with proteins localized to the nucleolus, the nuclear body where ribosome biogenesis initiates. FANCI functions in the processing of the pre-ribosomal RNA (pre-rRNA) for the large ribosomal subunit, the transcription of pre-rRNA by RNAPI, maintaining levels of the mature 28S ribosomal RNA (rRNA), and the global cellular translation of proteins by ribosomes. In the nucleolus, FANCI is predominantly in the deubiquitinated form and interacts with the large subunit of RNAPI and members of the PeBoW complex (PES1 and BOP1). There may be another role for FA proteins outside the nucleolus in ribosome biogenesis or protein translation as FANCI and FANCD2 are the only FA proteins associated with polysomes.

== Meiosis ==
In mice, FANCI protein participates in meiotic recombination of germ cells, and deletion of the Fanci gene causes a strong meiotic phenotype and severe hypogonadism. Fanci-/- male mice have completely impaired spermatogenesis, and female Fanci-/- mice produce no ovarian follicles.
