= FANC proteins =

Group of proteins

FANC proteins are a network of at least 15 proteins that are associated with a cell process known as the Fanconi anemia.

== History ==
Fanconi anemia was first described in 1927 by Guido Fanconi, a Swiss pediatrician. It is a chromosome instability syndrome characterized by the progressiveness of bone marrow failure and of cancer proneness.

== Properties ==
The FA genes that code for the FANC proteins are a part of the caretaker group of cancer genes that prevent the buildup of mutations and chromosome abnormalities. The multiple FANC proteins come together to add up to the FANC/BRCA pathway.

== Components ==
There are a large number of FANC proteins that participate in the FA pathway. It has a nuclear complex also known as the ‘FA core complex’ which is formed by the interaction of FANCA, FANCB, FANCC, FANCE, FANCF, FANCG, FANCL, FANCM and the accessory proteins (FAAP20, FAAP24, and FAAP100). These accessory proteins are also called Fanconi anemia associated proteins (FAAPs). There is also a group called the anchor complex which consists of FANCM, FAAP24, MHF1 (FAAP16/ CENP-S), and MHF2 (FAAP10/ CENP-X). The FANC proteins that are not a part of the core complex are FANCD1, FANCJ, and FANCN.

Components include:

- core protein complex (FANCA, FANCB, FANCC, FANCE, FANCF, FANCG, FANCL, FANCM)
- other: FANCD1, FANCD2, FANCI, FANCJ, FANCN, FANCP

== Function ==
They are involved in DNA replication and damage response. FANC proteins are also in charge of repairing complex DNA interstrand cross-linking lesions and maintaining the genomic stability during DNA replication. DNA cross-linking is what hinders transcription and replication from occurring in the cell so it is important that the cell has methods to repair at every stage of the cell cycle. There are multiple different repair pathways but the FA pathway is the one that involves the FANC proteins. When cross-link is detected, then the ataxia-telangiectasia and RAD3-related protein will mediate the phosphorylation (P) of the FA core complex. This phosphorylated FA core complex is what is required to have a successful monoubiquitination of the two components that form the FANCI–D2 complex. Each of the proteins of the FA core complex are needed for this phosphorylation step except for FANCM. When a typical cell senses DNA damage it targets the monoubiquitinated isoform of FANCI–D2 to the chromatid with DNA damage, which is the cross-link. Studies have also shown that there is a connection between the FA DNA repair pathway and stem cell regulation but it is still unclear. FANC proteins also play a role in redox signaling and repair of oxidative DNA damages. Recent studies have dove into the FANC protein, FANCJ, and its enzymatic function along with its roles in repair. Other studies have shown the correlation between the FANC pathway and multiple other protein post translational modifications from ubiquitin-like families.

== Pathogenesis ==
A mutation in 13 FANC genes can result in Fanconi anemia (FA), which is a cancer-prone chromosome instability disorder. Fanconi anemia occurs when there is a biallelic mutation that inactivates the genes that are in charge of the replication stress associated DNA damage response. Dysfunction of FANC proteins has been associated with a range of conditions, including the rendering of cell hypersensitivity to a type of DNA damage known as DNA interstrand cross-links (ICL) and defective DNA repair. FANC protein mutations have also lead to reduced fertility and predisposition to cancers like breast cancer and myeloid leukaemia. FANC proteins FANCD1 (BRCA2), FANCJ (BRIP), and FANCN (PALB2) have even been identified as the breast cancer susceptibility proteins. If a cell were to lack the FANC gene to code for these proteins then the cell would show a hypersensitive phenotype following H_{2}O_{2} treatment.

== Similar/ Related Protein ==
FANC proteins are related to BRCA.

FANC proteins are required to promote BLM-mediated anaphase.

FANC proteins also interacts with BRCA1.

FANC proteins also interacts with LIG4.

FANC proteins also interacts with DNA-PKcs.

FANC proteins also interacts with Ku70.

FANC proteins also interacts with Ku80.

FANC proteins also interacts with FAN1.

FANC proteins also interacts with XPF.

FANCC protein interacts with cdc2.

FANCC protein interacts with PKR.

FANCC protein interactS with p53.

FANC protein FANCD1 is also known as BRCA2.

FANC protein FANCJ is also known as BRIP1.

FANC protein FANCN is also known as PALB2.

FANC protein FANCO is also known as RAD51C.

FANC protein FANCP is also known as SLX4.
