= FANCL =

Protein-coding gene in the species Homo sapiens

Identifiers
- Aliases: FANCL, FAAP43, PHF9, POG, Fanconi anemia complementation group L, FA complementation group L
- External IDs: OMIM: 608111; MGI: 1914280; GeneCards: FANCL
Available structures
PDB	Ortholog search: PDBe RCSB
PDB	List of PDB id codes 3ZQS, 4CCG
Enzyme activity
EC #	BRENDA	ExPASy	KEGG	MetaCyc
2.3.2.27	↗	↗	↗	↗

Gene location (Human)
Chr.	Chromosome 2 (human)
Band	2p16.1	Start	58,159,243 bp
Band	2p16.1	End	58,241,410 bp

Gene location (Mouse)
Chr.	Chromosome 11 (mouse)
Band	11|11 A3.3	Start	26,336,135 bp
Band	11|11 A3.3	End	26,421,876 bp
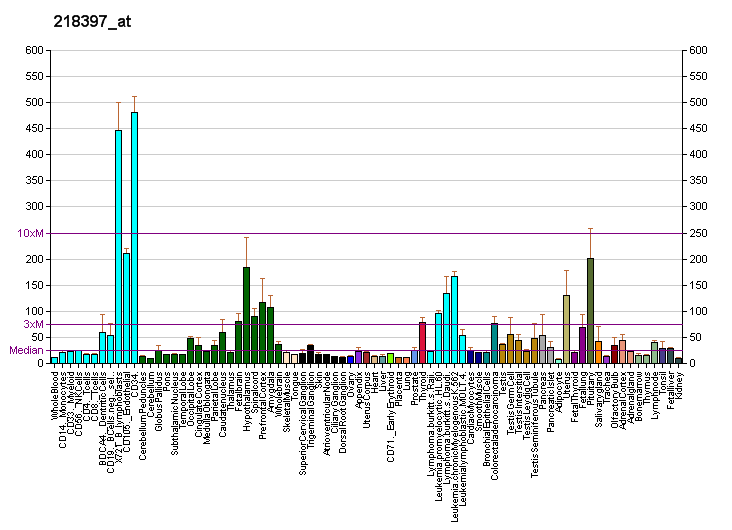
RNA expression pattern
Bgee	Human / Mouse (ortholog); Top expressed in: pituitary gland; anterior pituitary; Achilles tendon; right adrenal cortex; corpus callosum; left adrenal cortex; C1 segment; tibia; secondary oocyte; right uterine tube / Top expressed in: Paneth cell; primitive streak; abdominal wall; mandibular prominence; fetal liver hematopoietic progenitor cell; epiblast; endocardial cushion; maxillary prominence; interventricular septum; fossa; More reference expression data
BioGPS	More reference expression data
Gene ontology
Molecular function	ubiquitin-protein transferase activity; protein binding; metal ion binding; ubiquitin protein ligase binding; ubiquitin protein ligase activity; transferase activity
Cellular component	cytoplasm; nucleus; nuclear envelope; Fanconi anaemia nuclear complex; nucleoplasm; nuclear body; intracellular membrane-bounded organelle
Biological process	protein ubiquitination; gamete generation; regulation of cell population proliferation; interstrand cross-link repair; protein monoubiquitination; cellular response to DNA damage stimulus; DNA repair
Sources:Amigo / QuickGO
Orthologs
Databases	NCBI: entry; OMA: entry
Species	Human	Mouse
Entrez	55120	67030
Ensembl	ENSG00000115392	ENSMUSG00000004018
UniProt	Q9NW38	Q9CR14
RefSeq (mRNA)	NM_001114636; NM_018062; NM_001374615	NM_001277273; NM_025923
RefSeq (protein)	NP_001108108; NP_060532; NP_001361544	NP_001264202; NP_080199
Location (UCSC)	Chr 2: 58.16 – 58.24 Mb	Chr 11: 26.34 – 26.42 Mb
PubMed search
- Wikidata
View/Edit Human	View/Edit Mouse

E3 ubiquitin-protein ligase FANCL is an enzyme that in humans is encoded by the FANCL gene.

== Structure ==
The Fanconi Anemia (FA) DNA repair pathway is essential for the recognition and repair of DNA interstrand crosslinks (ICL). A critical step in the pathway is the monoubiquitination of FANCD2 by the RING E3 ligase FANCL. FANCL comprises three domains: a RING domain that interacts with E2 conjugating enzymes, a central domain required for substrate interaction, and an N-terminal E2-like fold (ELF) domain that interacts with FANCB. The ELF domain of FANCL is also required to mediate a non-covalent interaction between FANCL and ubiquitin. The ELF domain promotes efficient DNA damage-induced FANCD2 monoubiquitination in vertebrate cells, suggesting an important function of FANCB and ubiquitin binding by FANCL in vivo.

A nuclear complex containing FANCL (as well as FANCA, FANCB, FANCC, FANCE, FANCF, FANCG and FANCM) is essential for the activation of FANCD2 to the mono-ubiquitinated isoform. In normal, non-mutant cells FANCD2 is mono-ubiquitinated in response to DNA damage. Activated FANCD2 protein co-localizes with BRCA1 at ionizing radiation-induced foci and in synaptonemal complexes of meiotic chromosomes.

== Function ==
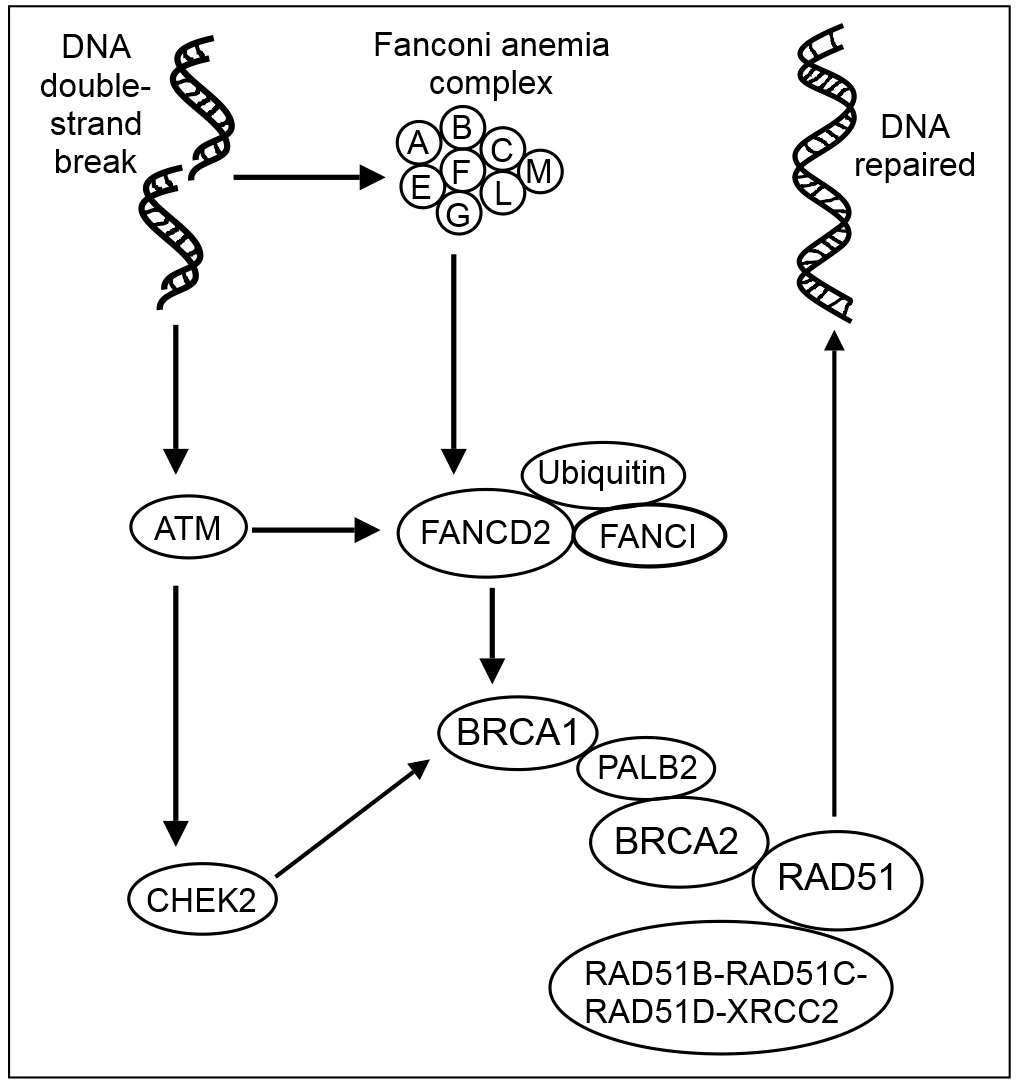
Recombinational repair of DNA double-strand damage - some key steps.

ATM (ATM) is a protein kinase that is recruited and activated by DNA double-strand breaks. DNA double-strand damages also activate the Fanconi anemia core complex (FANCA/B/C/E/F/G/L/M). The FA core complex monoubiquitinates the downstream targets FANCD2 and FANCI. ATM activates (phosphorylates) CHEK2 and FANCD2. CHEK2 phosphorylates BRCA1. Ubiquitinated FANCD2 complexes with BRCA1 and RAD51.

The PALB2 protein acts as a hub, bringing together BRCA1, BRCA2 and RAD51 at the site of a DNA double-strand break, and also binds to RAD51C, a member of the RAD51 paralog complex RAD51B-RAD51C-RAD51D-XRCC2 (BCDX2). The BCDX2 complex is responsible for RAD51 recruitment or stabilization at damage sites. RAD51 plays a major role in homologous recombinational repair of DNA during double-strand break repair. In this process, an ATP-dependent DNA strand exchange takes place in which a single strand invades base-paired strands of homologous DNA molecules. RAD51 is involved in the search for homology and strand pairing stages of the process.

== Clinical significance ==
The clinical phenotype of mutational defects in all Fanconi anemia (FA) complementation groups is similar. This phenotype is characterized by progressive bone marrow failure, cancer proneness and typical birth defects. The main cellular phenotype is hypersensitivity to DNA damage, particularly inter-strand DNA crosslinks. The FA proteins interact through a multi-protein pathway. DNA interstrand crosslinks are highly deleterious damages that are repaired by homologous recombination involving coordination of FA proteins and breast cancer susceptibility gene 1 (BRCA1).
