= Fanconi anemia =

Genetic disease causing anemia, birth defects, and cancers

- Fanconi anemia has an autosomal recessive pattern of inheritance.
- Pronunciation: English: /fɑːnˈkoʊni/, /fæn-/
- Specialty: Hematology
- Frequency: 0.005%

Fanconi anemia (FA), also known as Fanconi cancer, is a rare, autosomal recessive genetic disease characterized by aplastic anemia, congenital defects, endocrinological abnormalities, and an increased incidence of developing cancer. The study of Fanconi anemia has improved scientific understanding of the mechanisms of normal bone marrow function and the development of cancer. Among those affected, the majority develop cancer, most often acute myelogenous leukemia (AML), myelodysplastic syndrome (MDS), and liver cancer. 90% develop aplastic anemia (the inability to produce blood cells) by age 40. About 60–75% have congenital defects, commonly short stature, abnormalities of the skin, arms, head, eyes, kidneys, and ears, and developmental disabilities. Around 75% have some form of endocrine problem, with varying degrees of severity. 60% of FA is FANC-A, 16q24.3, which has a later onset of bone marrow failure.

FA is the result of a genetic defect in a cluster of proteins responsible for DNA repair via homologous recombination. The well-known cancer susceptibility genes BRCA1 and BRCA2 are also examples of FA genes (FANCS and FANCD1 respectively), and biallelic mutation of any of the two genes usually results in an embryonically lethal outcome, and should the proband come to term, experience a severe form of Fanconi anemia.

Treatment with androgens and hematopoietic (blood cell) growth factors can help bone marrow failure temporarily, but the long-term treatment is bone marrow transplant if a donor is available. Because of the genetic defect in DNA repair, cells from people with FA are sensitive to drugs that treat cancer by DNA crosslinking, such as mitomycin C. The typical age of death was 30 years in 2000.

FA occurs in about one per 130,000 live births, with a higher frequency in Ashkenazi Jews and Afrikaners in South Africa. The disease is named after the Swiss pediatrician who originally described this disorder, Guido Fanconi. Some forms of Fanconi anemia, such as those of complementation group D1, N, and S, are embryonically lethal in most cases, which might account for the rare observation of these complementation groups. It should not be confused with Fanconi syndrome, a kidney disorder also named after Dr. Fanconi.

== Signs and symptoms ==
FA is characterized by bone marrow failure, AML, solid tumors, and developmental abnormalities. Classic features include abnormal thumbs, absent radii, short stature, skin hyperpigmentation, including café au lait spots, abnormal facial features (triangular face, microcephaly), abnormal kidneys, and decreased fertility. Many FA patients (about 30%) do not have any of the classic physical findings, but diepoxybutane chromosome fragility assay, showing increased chromosomal breaks, can make the diagnosis. About 80% of FA will develop bone marrow failure by age 20.

The first sign of a hematologic problem is usually petechiae and bruises, with later onset of pale appearance, feeling tired, and infections. Because macrocytosis usually precedes a low platelet count, patients with typical congenital anomalies associated with FA should be evaluated for an elevated red blood cell mean corpuscular volume.

== Genetics ==
FA is primarily an autosomal recessive genetic disorder. This means that two mutated alleles (one from each parent) are required to cause the disease. The risk is 25% that each subsequent child will have FA. About 2% of FA cases are X-linked recessive, which means that if the mother carries one mutated Fanconi anemia allele on one X chromosome, a 50% chance exists that male offspring will present with Fanconi anemia.Scientists have identified 21 FA or FA-like genes: FANCA, FANCB, FANCC, FANCD1 (BRCA2), FANCD2, FANCE, FANCF, FANCG, FANCI, FANCJ (BRIP1), FANCL, FANCM, FANCN (PALB2), FANCO (RAD51C), FANCP (SLX4), FANCQ (XPF), FANCS (BRCA1), FANCT (UBE2T), FANCU (XRCC2), FANCV (REV7), and FANCW (RFWD3). FANCB is the one exception to FA being autosomal recessive, as this gene is on the X chromosome. These genes are involved in DNA repair.

The carrier frequency in the Ashkenazi Jewish population is about one in 90. Genetic counseling and genetic testing are recommended for families who may be carriers of Fanconi anemia.Because of the failure of hematologic components—white blood cells, red blood cells, and platelets—to develop, the body's capabilities to fight infection, deliver oxygen, and form clots are all diminished.

== Pathogenesis ==
Clinically, hematological abnormalities are the most serious symptoms of FA. By the age of 40, 98% of FA patients will have developed some type of hematological abnormality. However, a few cases have occurred in which older patients have died without ever developing them. Symptoms appear progressively and often lead to complete bone marrow failure. While at birth, blood count is usually normal, macrocytosis/megaloblastic anemia, defined as unusually large red blood cells, is the first detected abnormality, often within the first decade of life (median age of onset is 7 years). Within the next 10 years, over 50% of patients presenting haematological abnormalities will have developed pancytopenia, defined as abnormalities in two or more blood cell lineages. This is in contrast to Diamond–Blackfan anemia, which affects only erythrocytes, and Shwachman–Diamond syndrome, which primarily causes neutropenia. Most commonly, a low platelet count (thrombocytopenia) precedes a low neutrophil count (neutropenia), with both appearing with relatively equal frequencies. The deficiencies cause an increased risk of hemorrhage and recurrent infections, respectively.

As FA is now known to affect DNA repair, specifically homologous recombination, and given the current knowledge about dynamic cell division in the bone marrow, patients are consequently more likely to develop bone marrow failure, myelodysplastic syndromes, and acute myeloid leukemia (AML).

=== Myelodysplastic syndromes ===
MDSs, formerly known as preleukemia, are a group of bone marrow neoplastic diseases that share many of the morphologic features of AML, with some important differences. First, the percentage of undifferentiated progenitor cells, blast cells, is always less than 20%, with considerably more dysplasia, defined as cytoplasmic and nuclear morphologic changes in erythroid, granulocytic, and megakaryocytic precursors, than what is usually seen in cases of AML. These changes reflect delayed apoptosis or a failure of programmed cell death. When left untreated, MDS can lead to AML in about 30% of cases. Due to the nature of the FA pathology, MDS diagnosis cannot be made solely through cytogenetic analysis of the marrow. Indeed, it is only when morphologic analysis of marrow cells is performed that a diagnosis of MDS can be ascertained. Upon examination, MDS-affected FA patients will show many clonal variations, appearing either prior to or subsequent to the MDS. Furthermore, cells will show chromosomal aberrations, the most frequent being monosomy 7 and partial trisomies of chromosome 3q 15. Observation of monosomy 7 within the marrow is well correlated with an increased risk of developing AML and with a very poor prognosis, death generally ensuing within 2 years (unless prompt allogeneic hematopoietic progenitor cell transplant is an option).

=== Acute myeloid leukemia ===
FA patients are at elevated risk for the development of AML, defined as the presence of 20% or more of myeloid blasts in the marrow or 5 to 20% myeloid blasts in the blood. All of the subtypes of AML can occur in FA, except for promyelocytic. However, myelomonocytic and acute monocytic are the most common subtypes observed. Many MDS patients' diseases evolve into AML if they survive long enough. Furthermore, the risk of developing AML increases with the onset of bone marrow failure.

Although the risk of developing either MDS or AML before the age of 20 is only 27%, this risk increases to 43% by the age of 30 and 52% by the age of 40. Historically, even with a marrow transplant, about a quarter of FA patients diagnosed with MDS/ALS have died from MDS/ALS-related causes within two years, although more recent published evidence suggests that earlier allogeneic hematopoietic progenitor cell transplantation in children with FA is leading to better outcomes over time.

=== Bone marrow failure ===
The last major haematological complication associated with FA is bone marrow failure, defined as inadequate blood cell production. Several types of failure are observed in FA patients and generally precede MDS and AML. Detection of decreasing blood count is generally the first sign used to assess the necessity of treatment and possible transplant. While most FA patients are initially responsive to androgen therapy and haemopoietic growth factors, these have been shown to promote leukemia, especially in patients with clonal cytogenetic abnormalities, and have severe side effects, including hepatic adenomas and adenocarcinomas. The only treatment left would be a bone marrow transplant; however, such an operation has a relatively low success rate in FA patients when the donor is unrelated (30% 5-year survival). It is, therefore, imperative to transplant from an HLA-identical sibling. Furthermore, due to the increased susceptibility of FA patients to chromosomal damage, pretransplant conditioning cannot include high doses of radiation or immunosuppressants, thus increasing the chances of patients developing graft-versus-host disease. If all precautions are taken and the marrow transplant is performed within the first decade of life, a two-year probability of survival can be as high as 89%. However, if the transplant is performed at ages older than 10, two-year survival rates drop to 54%.

A recent report by Zhang et al. investigates the mechanism of bone marrow failure in FANCC-/- cells. They hypothesize and successfully demonstrate that continuous cycles of hypoxia-reoxygenation, such as those seen by haemopoietic and progenitor cells as they migrate between hyperoxic blood and hypoxic marrow tissues, leads to premature cellular senescence and therefore inhibition of haemopoietic function. Senescence, together with apoptosis, may constitute a major mechanism of haemopoietic cell depletion occurring in bone marrow failure.

=== Molecular basis ===
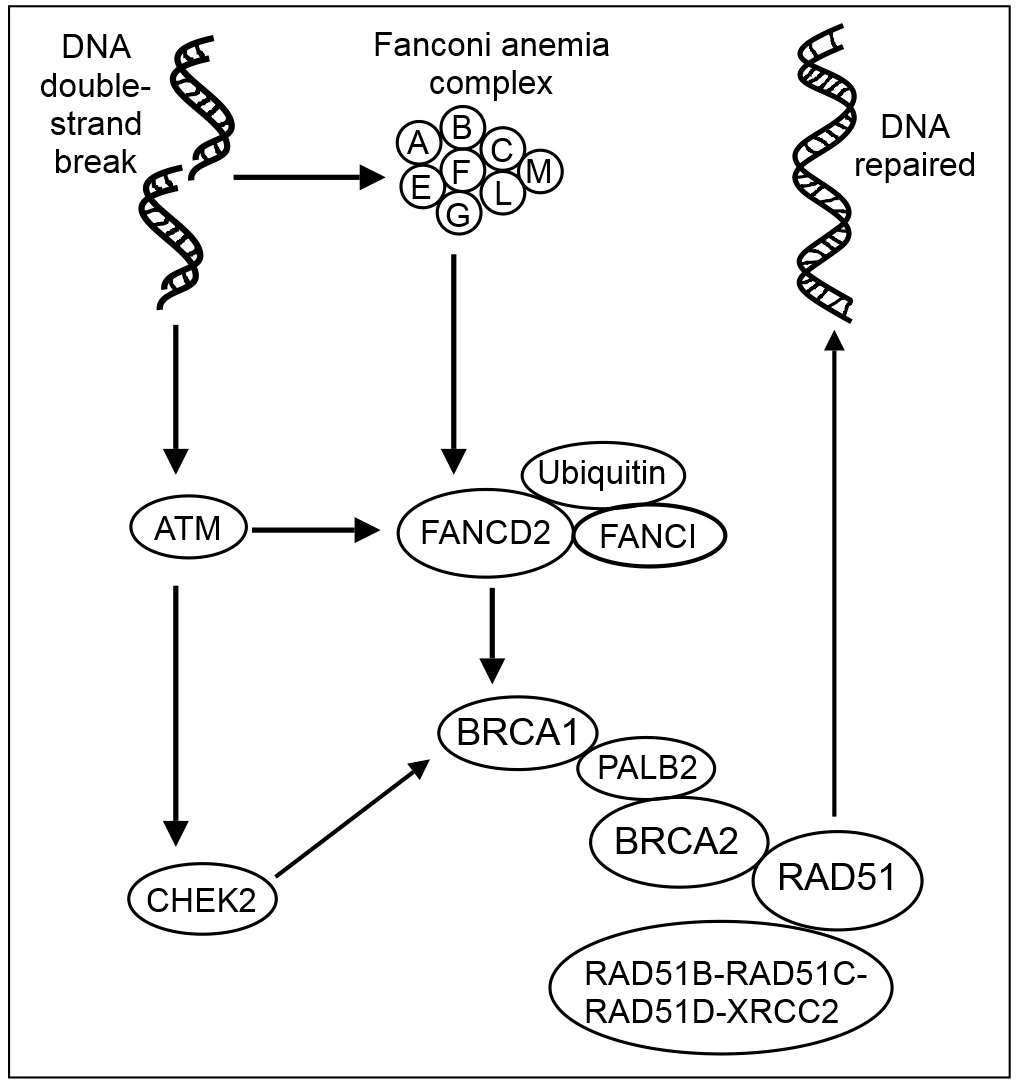
DNA double-strand repair involves ATM activation, phosphorylation of CHEK2/FANCD2, FA core monoubiquitination of FANCD2/FANCI, and assembly of BRCA1, BRCA2, and RAD51 by PALB2. RAD51 enables homologous recombination for repair. (Recombinational repair of DNA double-strand damage - some key steps. ATM (ATM) is a protein kinase that is recruited and activated by DNA double-strand breaks. DNA double-strand damages also activate the Fanconi anemia core complex (FANCA/B/C/E/F/G/L/M). The FA core complex monoubiquitinates the downstream targets FANCD2 and FANCI. ATM activates (phosphorylates) CHEK2 and FANCD2 CHEK2 phosphorylates BRCA1. Ubiquinated FANCD2 complexes with BRCA1 and RAD51. The PALB2 protein acts as a hub, bringing together BRCA1, BRCA2 and RAD51 at the site of a DNA double-strand break, and also binds to RAD51C, a member of the RAD51 paralog complex RAD51B-RAD51C-RAD51D-XRCC2 (BCDX2). The BCDX2 complex is responsible for RAD51 recruitment or stabilization at damage sites. RAD51 plays a major role in homologous recombinational repair of DNA during double-strand break repair. In this process, an ATP-dependent DNA strand exchange takes place in which a single strand invades base-paired strands of homologous DNA molecules. RAD51 is involved in the search for homology and strand pairing stages of the process.)

There are 22 genes responsible for FA, one of them being the breast-cancer susceptibility gene BRCA2. They are involved in the recognition and repair of damaged DNA; genetic defects leave them unable to repair DNA. The FA core complex of 8 proteins is normally activated when DNA stops replicating because of damage. The core complex adds ubiquitin, a small protein that combines with BRCA2 in another cluster to repair DNA (see Figure Recombinational repair of DNA double-strand damage). At the end of the process, ubiquitin is removed.

Recent studies have shown that eight of these proteins, FANCA, -B, -C, -E, -F, -G, -L, and -M, assemble to form a core protein complex in the nucleus. According to current models, the complex moves from the cytoplasm into the nucleus following nuclear localization signals on FANCA and FANCE. Assembly is activated by replicative stress, particularly DNA damage caused by cross-linking agents (such as mitomycin C or cisplatin) or reactive oxygen species (ROS) that is detected by the FANCM protein.

Following assembly, the protein core complex activates FANCL protein, which acts as an E3 ubiquitin-ligase and monoubiquitinates FANCD2 and FANCI.

Monoubiquitinated FANCD2, also known as FANCD2-L, then goes on to interact with a BRCA1/BRCA2 complex (see Figure Recombinational repair of DNA double-strand damage). Details are not known, but similar complexes are involved in genome surveillance and associated with a variety of proteins implicated in DNA repair and chromosomal stability. With a crippling mutation in any FA protein in the complex, DNA repair is much less effective, as shown by its response to damage caused by cross-linking agents such as cisplatin, diepoxybutane and Mitomycin C. Bone marrow is particularly sensitive to this defect.

In another pathway responding to ionizing radiation, FANCD2 is thought to be phosphorylated by protein complex ATM/ATR activated by double-strand DNA breaks and takes part in S-phase checkpoint control. This pathway was proven by the presence of radioresistant DNA synthesis, the hallmark of a defect in the S phase checkpoint, in patients with FA-D1 or FA-D2. Such a defect readily leads to uncontrollable replication of cells and might also explain the increased frequency of AML in these patients.

FA proteins have cellular roles in autophagy and ribosome biogenesis in addition to DNA repair. FANCC, FANCA, FANCF, FANCL, FANCD2, BRCA1, and BRCA2 are required to clear damaged mitochondria from the cell (a process called mitophagy). BRCA1 (also known as FANCS) interacts with the ribosomal DNA (rDNA) promoter and terminator in the nucleolus, the cellular location where ribosome biogenesis initiates, and is required for transcription of rDNA. FANCI functions in the production of the large ribosomal subunit by processing pre-ribosomal RNA (pre-rRNA), the transcription of pre-rRNA by RNAPI, maintaining levels of the mature 28S ribosomal RNA (rRNA), and the global cellular translation of proteins by ribosomes. In the nucleolus, FANCI is predominantly in the deubiquitinated form. In addition, FANCA is required to maintain normal nucleolar morphology, for transcription of pre-rRNA, and global cellular translation. FANCC, FANCD2, FANCG are also required to maintain normal nucleolar morphology and FANCG is also required for global cellular translation. There may be a role for FA proteins outside the nucleolus in ribosome biogenesis or protein translation, as FANCI and FANCD2 were the only FA proteins associated with polysomes. Other inherited bone marrow failure syndromes also have defects in ribosome biogenesis or protein translation, including dyskeratosis congenita, Diamond-Blackfan anemia, and Shwachman Diamond Syndrome, and like these other diseases, FA may also be a ribosomopathy.

=== Spermatogenesis ===
In humans, infertility is one of the characteristics of individuals with mutational defects in the FANC genes. In mice, spermatogonia, preleptotene spermatocytes, and spermatocytes in the meiotic stages of leptotene, zygotene and early pachytene are enriched for FANC proteins. This finding suggests that recombinational repair processes mediated by the FANC proteins are active during germ cell development, particularly during meiosis, and that defects in this activity can lead to infertility.

=== Neural stem cell homeostasis ===
Microphthalmia and microcephaly are frequent congenital defects in FA patients. The loss of FANCA and FANCG in mice causes neural progenitor apoptosis both during early developmental neurogenesis and later during adult neurogenesis. This leads to depletion of the neural stem cell pool with aging. Much of the Fanconi anemia phenotype might be interpreted as a reflection of premature aging of stem cells.

== Treatment ==
The first line of therapy is androgens and hematopoietic growth factors, but only 50–75% of patients respond. A more permanent cure is hematopoietic stem cell transplantation. If no potential donors exist, a savior sibling can be conceived by preimplantation genetic diagnosis (PGD) to match the recipient's HLA type.

== Prognosis ==
Many patients eventually develop acute myelogenous leukemia (AML). Older patients are extremely likely to develop head and neck, esophageal, gastrointestinal, vulvar and anal cancers. Patients who have had a successful stem cell transplant and, thus, are cured of the blood problem associated with FA still must have regular examinations to watch for signs of cancer. Many patients do not reach adulthood.

The overarching medical challenge that Fanconi patients face is a failure of their bone marrow to produce blood cells. In addition, Fanconi patients are normally born with a variety of birth defects. A significant number of Fanconi patients have kidney problems, trouble with their eyes, developmental delay, and other serious defects, such as microcephaly (small head).
