= Danny Go! =

American children's media channel

YouTube information
- Channel: Danny Go!
- Years active: 2019–present
- Genres: Education; nursery rhymes
- Subscribers: 5.14 million
- Views: 5.86 billion
- Last updated: 27 August 2026
- Website: www.dannygo.net

Danny Go! is an American musical children’s educational media channel created and hosted by Daniel Coleman and consists of Coleman’s wife Mindy Coleman (Mindy Mango), Matthew Padgett (Pap Pap), Michael Finster (Bearhead), and Dominic Geralds (Gerald). The live-action show incorporates dancing, singing, and exercise to encourage children to learn, have fun, and stay active. As of August 2026 the channel has over 5.1 million subscribers and 5.8 billion total video views on YouTube.

== History ==
Prior to Danny Go!, Daniel Coleman and childhood friends Michael Finster and Matthew Padgett formed Campbell the Band while living in Charlotte, North Carolina. Coleman met his future wife Mindy while studying marketing at the University of North Carolina at Charlotte and worked in advertising at Lowe's where he developed a YouTube miniseries called “The Wall” before becoming a children’s musician. Their son Isaac, who had Fanconi anemia died of cancer in 2026 at the age of 14.

The original format for the show was inspired by Mister Rogers' Neighborhood, but they found more success with music videos. Danny Go!'s upbeat dance music style became popular with school teachers, who would use the videos to energize children in class. The first breakout video was The Wiggle Dance.

In 2026, Netflix announced that they had commissioned five episodes of Danny Go! for their platform. They released season 2 on August 24th, 2026 for 6 episodes.

== Cast ==
- Daniel Coleman as Danny Go
- Matthew Padgett as Pap Pap
- Michael Finster as Bearhead
- Mindy Coleman as Mindy Mango
- Dominic Geralds as Gerald
