= Fanconi anemia group G protein =

Protein-coding gene in the species Homo sapiens

FANCG

Identifiers
- Aliases: FANCG, FAG, XRCC9, Fanconi anemia complementation group G, FA complementation group G
- External IDs: OMIM: 602956; MGI: 1926471; GeneCards: FANCG

Gene location (Human)
Chr.	Chromosome 9 (human)
Band	9p13.3	Start	35,073,835 bp
Band	9p13.3	End	35,080,004 bp

Gene location (Mouse)
Chr.	Chromosome 4 (mouse)
Band	4|4 A5	Start	43,002,343 bp
Band	4|4 A5	End	43,010,506 bp
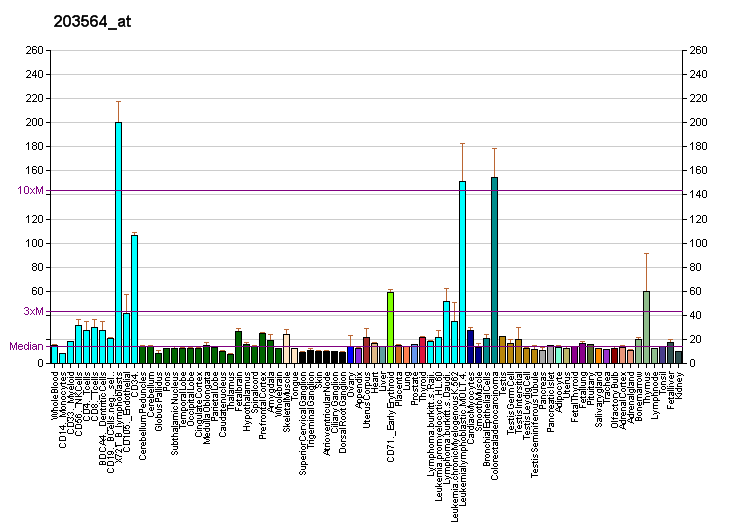
RNA expression pattern
Bgee	Human / Mouse (ortholog); Top expressed in: ventricular zone; ganglionic eminence; right hemisphere of cerebellum; mucosa of transverse colon; granulocyte; body of pancreas; left testis; right testis; rectum; right frontal lobe / Top expressed in: spermatocyte; aortic valve; neural layer of retina; spermatid; ascending aorta; yolk sac; seminiferous tubule; cumulus cell; granulocyte; thymus; More reference expression data
BioGPS	More reference expression data
Gene ontology
Molecular function	damaged DNA binding; protein binding; signal transducer activity
Cellular component	plasma membrane; nucleolus; Fanconi anaemia nuclear complex; mitochondrion; nucleus; nucleoplasm; cytoplasm; cytosol; intracellular anatomical structure
Biological process	ovarian follicle development; response to radiation; mitochondrion organization; interstrand cross-link repair; DNA repair; spermatid development; cellular response to DNA damage stimulus; phosphorelay signal transduction system
Sources:Amigo / QuickGO
Orthologs
Databases	NCBI: entry; OMA: entry
Species	Human	Mouse
Entrez	2189	60534
Ensembl	ENSG00000221829	ENSMUSG00000028453
UniProt	O15287	Q9EQR6
RefSeq (mRNA)	NM_004629	NM_001163233; NM_053081
RefSeq (protein)	NP_004620	NP_001156705; NP_444311
Location (UCSC)	Chr 9: 35.07 – 35.08 Mb	Chr 4: 43 – 43.01 Mb
PubMed search
- Wikidata
View/Edit Human	View/Edit Mouse

Fanconi anemia group G protein is a protein that in humans is encoded by the FANCG gene.

== Function ==
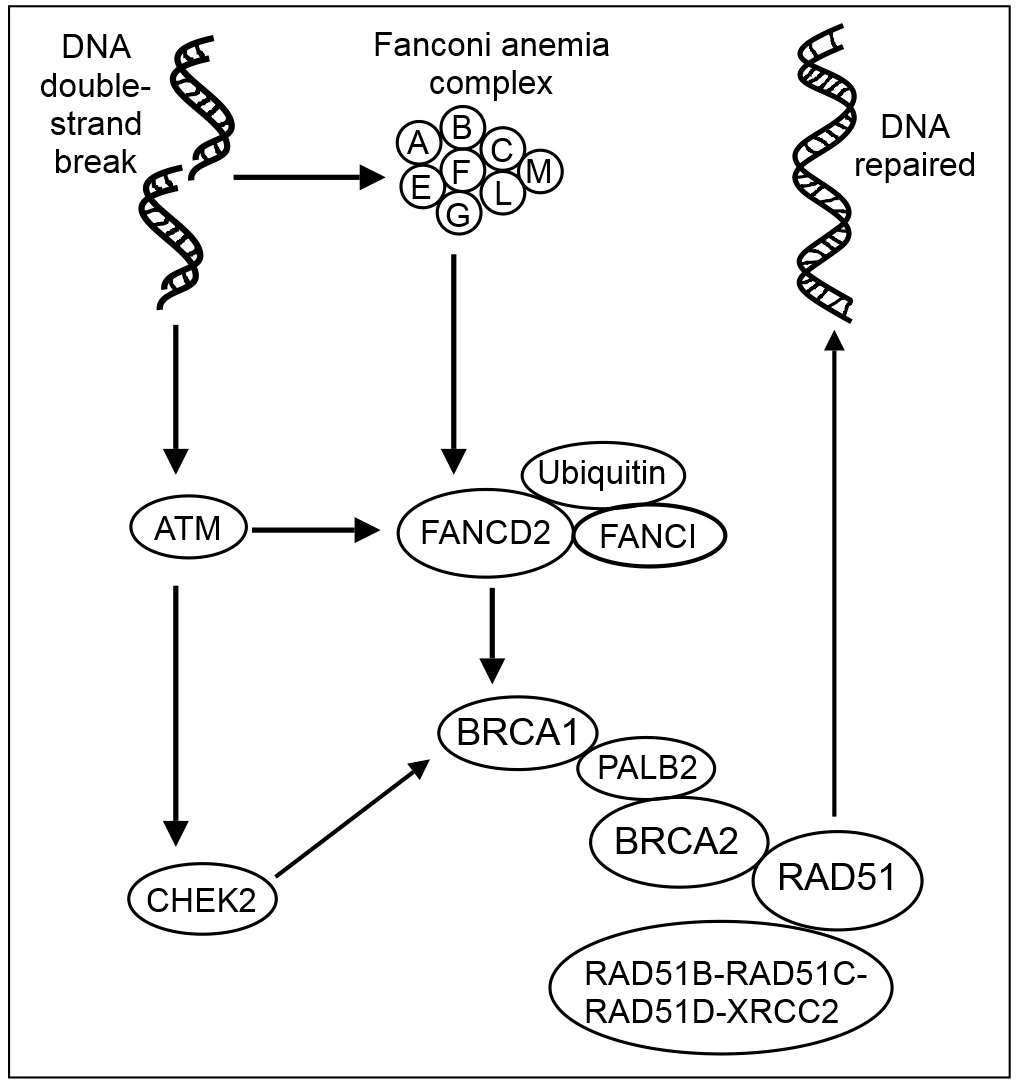
Recombinational repair of DNA double-strand damage - some key steps. ATM (ATM) is a protein kinase that is recruited and activated by DNA double-strand breaks. DNA double-strand damages also activate the Fanconi anemia core complex (FANCA/B/C/E/F/G/L/M). The FA core complex monoubiquitinates the downstream targets FANCD2 and FANCI. ATM activates (phosphorylates) CHEK2 and FANCD2 CHEK2 phosphorylates BRCA1. Ubiquinated FANCD2 complexes with BRCA1 and RAD51. The PALB2 protein acts as a hub, bringing together BRCA1, BRCA2 and RAD51 at the site of a DNA double-strand break, and also binds to RAD51C, a member of the RAD51 paralog complex RAD51B-RAD51C-RAD51D-XRCC2 (BCDX2). The BCDX2 complex is responsible for RAD51 recruitment or stabilization at damage sites. RAD51 plays a major role in homologous recombinational repair of DNA during double strand break repair. In this process, an ATP dependent DNA strand exchange takes place in which a single strand invades base-paired strands of homologous DNA molecules. RAD51 is involved in the search for homology and strand pairing stages of the process.

FANCG, involved in Fanconi anemia, confers resistance to both hygromycin B and mitomycin C. FANCG contains a 5-prime GC-rich untranslated region characteristic of housekeeping genes. The putative 622-amino acid protein has a leucine-zipper motif at its N-terminus. Fanconi anemia is an autosomal recessive disorder with diverse clinical symptoms, including developmental anomalies, bone marrow failure, and early occurrence of malignancies. A minimum of 8 FA genes have been identified. The FANCG gene is responsible for complementation group G.

The clinical phenotype of all Fanconi anemia (FA) complementation groups is similar. This phenotype is characterized by progressive bone marrow failure, cancer proneness and typical birth defects. The main cellular phenotype is hypersensitivity to DNA damage, particularly inter-strand DNA crosslinks. The FA proteins interact through a multiprotein pathway. DNA interstrand crosslinks are highly deleterious damages that are repaired by homologous recombination involving coordination of FA proteins and breast cancer susceptibility gene 1 (BRCA1), but the exact biochemical roles of these proteins is currently unclear.

A nuclear complex containing FANCG (as well as FANCA, FANCB, FANCC, FANCE, FANCF, FANCL and FANCM) is essential for the activation of the FANCD2 protein to the mono-ubiquitinated isoform. In normal, non-mutant, cells FANCD2 is mono-ubiquinated in response to DNA damage. Activated FANCD2 protein co-localizes with BRCA1 (breast cancer susceptibility protein) at ionizing radiation-induced foci and in synaptonemal complexes of meiotic chromosomes (see Figure: Recombinational repair of double strand damage).

== Meiosis ==
Activated FANCD2 protein may function prior to the initiation of meiotic recombination, perhaps to prepare chromosomes for synapsis, or to regulate subsequent recombination events.

Male and female FANCG mutant mice have defective gametogenesis, hypogonadism and impaired fertility, consistent with the phenotype of FA patients. In the non-mutant mouse, FANCG protein is expressed in spermatogonia, preleptotene spermatocytes and spermatocytes in the leptotene, zygotene and early pachytene stages of meiosis.

== Aging ==
Loss of FANCG causes neural progenitor apoptosis during forebrain development, likely related to defective DNA repair. (Sii-Felice et al., 2008). This effect persists in adulthood leading to depletion of the neural stem cell pool with aging. The FA phenotype can be interpreted as a premature aging of stem cells, DNA damages being the driving force of aging. (Also see DNA damage theory of aging).

== Interactions ==
FANCG has been shown to interact with FANCF,

FANCA, FANCE and BRCA2.
