= Fanconi anemia group B protein =

Protein found in humans

FANCB

Identifiers
- Aliases: FANCB, FA2, FAAP90, FAAP95, FAB, FACB, Fanconi anemia complementation group B, FA complementation group B
- External IDs: OMIM: 300515; MGI: 2448558; GeneCards: FANCB

Gene location (Human)
| Chr. | X chromosome (human) |
| Band | Xp22.2 | Start | 14,690,388 bp |
| Band | Xp22.2 | End | 14,873,255 bp |

Gene location (Mouse)
| Chr. | X chromosome (mouse) |
| Band | X|X F5 | Start | 163,763,588 bp |
| Band | X|X F5 | End | 163,780,268 bp |
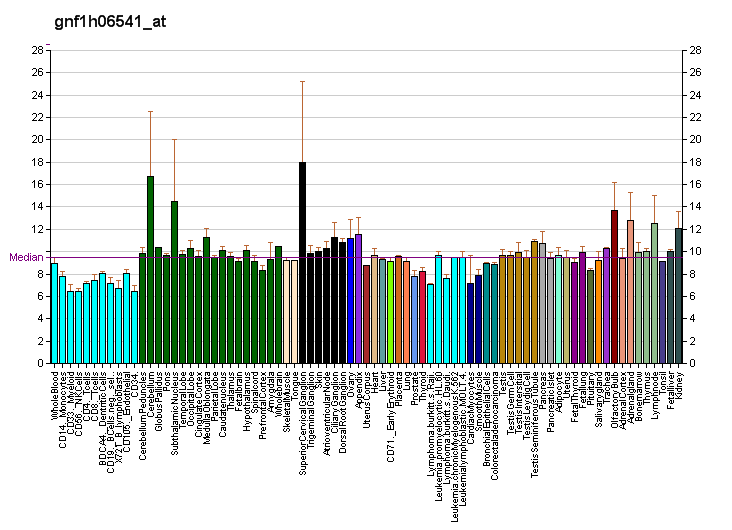

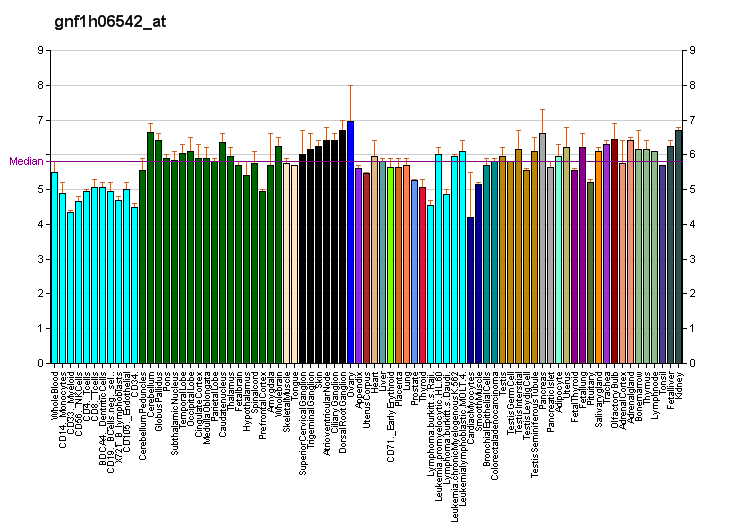
RNA expression pattern
| Bgee | Human / Mouse (ortholog); Top expressed in: testicle; gonad; buccal mucosa cell; internal globus pallidus; ventricular zone; bone marrow cell; ganglionic eminence; stromal cell of endometrium; monocyte; secondary oocyte / Top expressed in: hand; primitive streak; secondary oocyte; epiblast; dermis; primary oocyte; medullary collecting duct; zygote; Paneth cell; tail of embryo; More reference expression data |
| BioGPS | More reference expression data |
Gene ontology
| Molecular function | protein binding |
| Cellular component | nucleus; nucleoplasm; Fanconi anaemia nuclear complex |
| Biological process | interstrand cross-link repair; cellular response to DNA damage stimulus; DNA repair; positive regulation of double-strand break repair via homologous recombination; replication-born double-strand break repair via sister chromatid exchange; negative regulation of double-strand break repair via homologous recombination |
Sources:Amigo / QuickGO
Orthologs
| Databases | NCBI: entry; OMA: entry |
| Species | Human | Mouse |
| Entrez | 2187 | 237211 |
| Ensembl | ENSG00000181544 | ENSMUSG00000047757 |
| UniProt | Q8NB91 | Q5XJY6 |
| RefSeq (mRNA) | NM_001018113; NM_152633; NM_001324162 | NM_001146081; NM_175027 |
| RefSeq (protein) | NP_001018123; NP_001311091; NP_689846 | NP_001139553; NP_778192 |
| Location (UCSC) | Chr X: 14.69 – 14.87 Mb | Chr X: 163.76 – 163.78 Mb |
| PubMed search |
- Wikidata
| View/Edit Human | View/Edit Mouse |

Fanconi anemia group B protein is a protein that in humans is encoded by the FANCB gene.

== Function ==
The Fanconi anemia complementation group (FANC) currently includes FANCA, FANCB, FANCC, FANCD1 (also called BRCA2), FANCD2, FANCE, FANCF, FANCG, and FANCL. Fanconi anemia is a genetically heterogeneous recessive disorder characterized by cytogenetic instability, hypersensitivity to DNA crosslinking agents, increased chromosomal breakage, and defective DNA repair. The members of the Fanconi anemia complementation group do not share sequence similarity; they are related by their assembly into a common nuclear protein complex. This gene encodes the protein for complementation group B. Alternative splicing results in two transcript variants encoding the same protein.

== Gene ==
FANCB is the only gene known to cause X-linked Fanconi anemia. In female carriers of FANCB mutations (one wild-type FANCB allele and one mutant FANCB allele), there is strong selection through X-inactivation for expression of only the wild-type allele. In contrast, males have only one FANCB allele. Only male patients with Fanconi anemia have ever been linked to FANCB mutations, and they make up about 4% of cases.

Mutations in the FANCB gene are highly associated with the development of the VACTERL-H constellation of birth defects. In a cohort study of 19 children with FANCB variants, those with deletion of the FANCB gene or truncation of FANCB protein demonstrate earlier-than-average onset of bone marrow failure and more severe congenital abnormalities compared with a large series of Fanconi Anemia individuals in published reports. This reflects the indispensable role of the FANCB gene in cells. For FANCB missense variants, more variable severity is associated with the extent of residual activity.

== Protein ==
The FANCB gene product is FANCB protein. FANCB is a component of a "core complex" of nine Fanconi anemia proteins: FANCA, FANCB, FANCC, FANCE, FANCF, FANCG, FANCL, FAAP100 and FAAP20. The core complex localises to DNA damage sites during DNA replication where it catalyzes transfer of ubiquitin to FANCD2 and FANCI. In particular, this reaction is necessary for the repair of DNA interstrand crosslinks, such as those formed by chemotherapy drugs cisplatin, mitomycin c and melphalan.

Within the Fanconi anemia core complex, FANCB has an obligate interaction with FAAP100 and FANCL, to form a catalytic E3 RING ligase enzyme. FANCB creates a dimer interface within this subcomplex that is required for simultaneous ubiquitination of FANCD2 and FANCI. Electron microscopy imaging of the FANCB-FANCL-FAAP100 complex revealed a symmetry that is centred on FANCB, and biochemical investigation confirmed that the entire complex is a dimer containing two of each subunit. Further imaging reveals the overall architecture of the Fanconi Anemia core complex centres on FANCB protein.

== Meiosis ==
FANCB mutant mice are infertile and exhibit primordial germ cell defects during embryogenesis. The germ cells and testicular size are severely compromised in FANCB mutant mice. FANCB protein is essential for spermatogenesis and likely has a role in the activation of the Fanconi anemia DNA repair pathway during meiosis.
