= Fanconi anemia group D2 protein =

Protein-coding gene in the species Homo sapiens

FANCD2

Identifiers
- Aliases: FANCD2, FA-D2, FA4, FACD, FAD, FAD2, FANCD, Fanconi anemia complementation group D2, FA complementation group D2
- External IDs: OMIM: 613984; MGI: 2448480; GeneCards: FANCD2

Gene location (Human)
Chr.	Chromosome 3 (human)
Band	3p25.3	Start	10,026,370 bp
Band	3p25.3	End	10,101,932 bp
RNA expression pattern
Bgee	Human / Mouse (ortholog); Top expressed in: testicle; ventricular zone; secondary oocyte; right testis; left testis; ganglionic eminence; bone marrow cell; buccal mucosa cell; mucosa of transverse colon; gonad / n/a; More reference expression data
BioGPS	n/a
Gene ontology
Molecular function	protein binding; DNA polymerase binding
Cellular component	nucleolus; nucleus; nucleoplasm; condensed chromosome; cytosol; nuclear body
Biological process	cell cycle; gamete generation; homologous chromosome pairing at meiosis; response to gamma radiation; interstrand cross-link repair; cellular response to DNA damage stimulus; regulation of DNA-binding transcription factor activity; regulation of CD40 signaling pathway; regulation of regulatory T cell differentiation; brain morphogenesis; neuronal stem cell population maintenance; regulation of inflammatory response; cellular response to oxidative stress; DNA repair
Sources:Amigo / QuickGO
Orthologs
Databases	NCBI: entry; OMA: entry
Species	Human	Mouse
Entrez	2177	211651
Ensembl	ENSG00000144554	n/a
UniProt	Q9BXW9	Q80V62
RefSeq (mRNA)	NM_001018115; NM_033084; NM_001319984; NM_001374253; NM_001374254 NM_001374255	NM_001033244; NM_001347350
RefSeq (protein)	NP_001018125; NP_001306913; NP_149075; NP_001361182; NP_001361183 NP_001361184	NP_001028416; NP_001334279
Location (UCSC)	Chr 3: 10.03 – 10.1 Mb	n/a
PubMed search
- Wikidata
View/Edit Human	View/Edit Mouse

Fanconi anemia group D2 protein (FANCD2) is a nuclear protein that in humans is encoded by the FANCD2 gene that plays a central role in the Fanconi anemia (FA)/BRCA pathway, which safeguards genome stability by coordinating the repair of DNA interstrand crosslinks and other DNA replication‑blocking lesions. In response to DNA damage or S phase progression, FANCD2 is activated by ubiquitination by the FA core complex and forms a heterodimeric complex with FANCI. This complex localizes to chromatin foci together with BRCA1 and other DNA repair factors, where it helps orchestrate nucleolytic processing and downstream repair events.

Germline loss‑of‑function mutations in FANCD2 cause the FA complementation group D2 subtype, characterized by bone marrow failure, congenital abnormalities, chromosomal instability and markedly increased risk of hematologic and solid malignancies. Dysregulated FANCD2 expression and activity have also been implicated in the development and progression of sporadic cancers.

Fanconi anemia proteins, including FANCD2, are an emerging therapeutic target in cancer

== Function ==
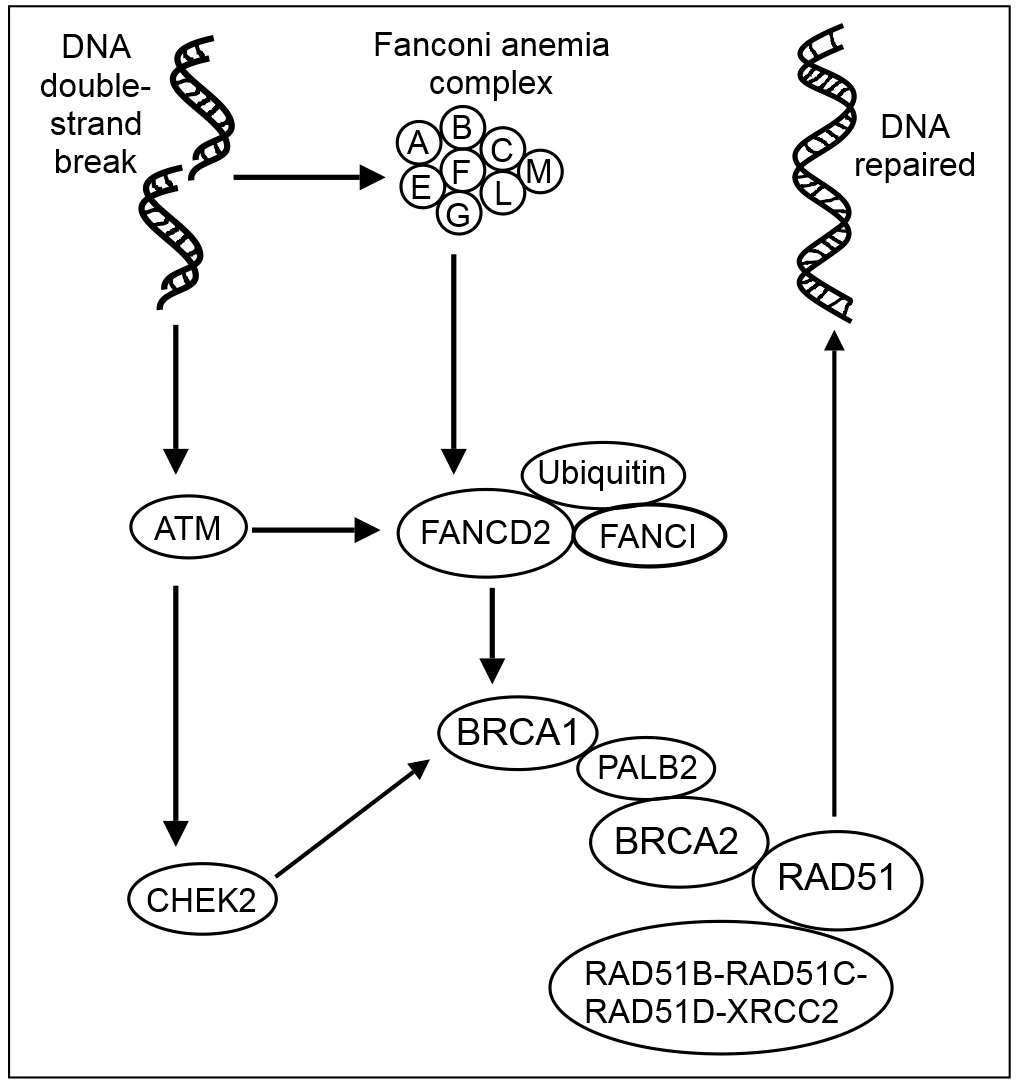
Recombinational repair of DNA double-strand damage - some key steps. ATM (ATM) is a protein kinase that is recruited and activated by DNA double-strand breaks. DNA double-strand damages also activate the Fanconi anemia core complex (FANCA/B/C/E/F/G/L/M). The FA core complex monoubiquitinates the downstream targets FANCD2 and FANCI. ATM activates (phosphorylates) CHEK2 and FANCD2. CHEK2 phosphorylates BRCA1. Ubiquinated FANCD2 complexes with BRCA1 and RAD51. The PALB2 protein acts as a hub, bringing together BRCA1, BRCA2 and RAD51 at the site of a DNA double-strand break, and also binds to RAD51C, a member of the RAD51 paralog complex RAD51B-RAD51C-RAD51D-XRCC2 (BCDX2). The BCDX2 complex is responsible for RAD51 recruitment or stabilization at damage sites. RAD51 plays a major role in homologous recombinational repair of DNA during double strand break repair. In this process, an ATP dependent DNA strand exchange takes place in which a single strand invades base-paired strands of homologous DNA molecules. RAD51 is involved in the search for homology and strand pairing stages of the process.

This gene encodes the Fanconi anemia complementation group D2 protein (FANCD2), a central component of the Fanconi anemia DNA repair pathway. FANCD2 is monoubiquitinated in response to DNA damage, resulting in its localization to nuclear foci with other proteins including BRCA1 and BRCA2 involved in homology-directed DNA repair. A nuclear complex containing FANCA, FANCB, FANCC, FANCE, FANCF, FANCL, and FANCG proteins is required for activation of FANCD2 to the mono-ubiquitinated isoform.

Mono-ubiquination of FANCD2 is essential for repairing DNA interstrand crosslinks and clamps the protein on DNA together with its partner protein FANCI. The monoubiquitinated FANCD2:FANCI complex coats DNA in a filament-like array, potentially protecting DNA associated with stalled replication forks.

Mono-ubiquitination is also required for interaction with the nuclease FAN1. Recruitment of FAN1 by ubiquitinated FANCD2 restrains DNA replication fork progression and helps prevent chromosome abnormalities when replication forks stall.

== Clinical significance ==
=== Fanconi anemia ===
Fanconi anemia is a disorder with a recessive Mendelian pattern of inheritance characterized by chromosomal instability, hypersensitivity to DNA crosslinking agents, increased chromosomal breakage, and defective DNA repair. Mutations in FANCD2 cause Fanconi anemia complementation group D2. The members of the Fanconi anemia complementation group do not share sequence similarity, but are related through their assembly into a common nuclear protein complex involved in DNA repair.

=== Cancer ===
FANCD2 mutant mice have a significantly increased incidence of tumors including ovarian, gastric and hepatic adenomas as well as hepatocellular, lung, ovarian and mammary carcinomas. Humans with a FANCD2 deficiency have increased acute myeloid leukemia, and squamous cell carcinomas (head and neck squamous cell carcinomas and anogenital carcinomas). Lung squamous tumors express high levels of FANCD2 and members of Fanconia anemia pathway.

FANCD2 monoubiquitination is also a potential therapeutic target in the treatment of cancer.

=== Smoking ===
Tobacco smoke suppresses the expression of FANCD2, which codes for a DNA damage "caretaker" or repair mechanism.

=== Infertility ===
Humans with a FANCD deficiency display hypogonadism, male infertility, impaired spermatogenesis, and reduced female fertility. Similarly, mice deficient in FANCD2 show hypogonadism, impaired fertility and impaired gametogenesis.

In the non-mutant mouse, FANCD2 is expressed in spermatogonia, pre-leptotene spermatocytes, and in spermatocytes in the leptotene, zygotene and early pachytene stages of meiosis. In synaptonemal complexes of meiotic chromosomes, activated FANCD2 protein co-localizes with BRCA1 (breast cancer susceptibility protein). FANCD2 mutant mice exhibit chromosome mis-pairing during the pachytene stage of meiosis and germ cell loss. Activated FANCD2 protein may normally function prior to the initiation of meiotic recombination, perhaps to prepare chromosomes for synapsis, or to regulate subsequent recombination events.

== Interactions ==
FANCD2 has been shown to interact with:

- FANCI
- Ataxia telangiectasia mutated,
- BARD1,
- BRCA1.
- BRCA2,
- FANCE,
- HTATIP, and
- MEN1.
