= Fanconi anemia group A protein =

Protein-coding gene in the species Homo sapiens

FANCA

Identifiers
- Aliases: FANCA, FA, FA-H, FA1, FAA, FACA, FAH, FANCH, Fanconi anemia complementation group A, FA complementation group A
- External IDs: OMIM: 607139; MGI: 1341823; GeneCards: FANCA

Gene location (Human)
Chr.	Chromosome 16 (human)
Band	16q24.3	Start	89,726,683 bp
Band	16q24.3	End	89,816,977 bp

Gene location (Mouse)
Chr.	Chromosome 8 (mouse)
Band	8 E1|8 72.1 cM	Start	123,995,039 bp
Band	8 E1|8 72.1 cM	End	124,045,315 bp
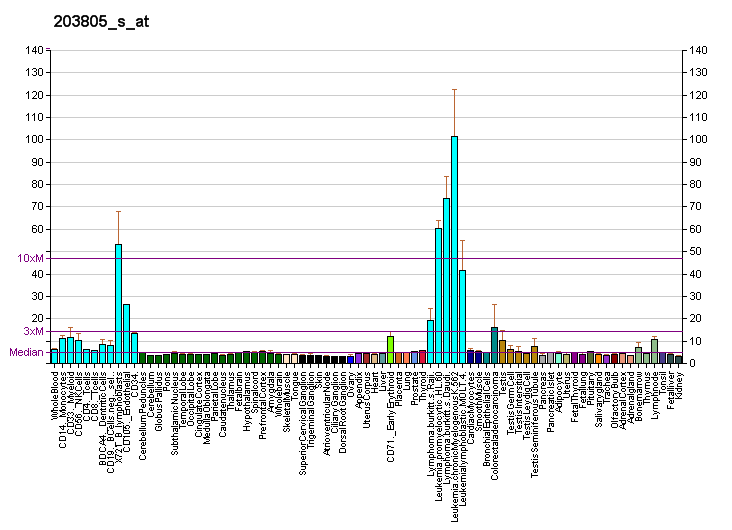

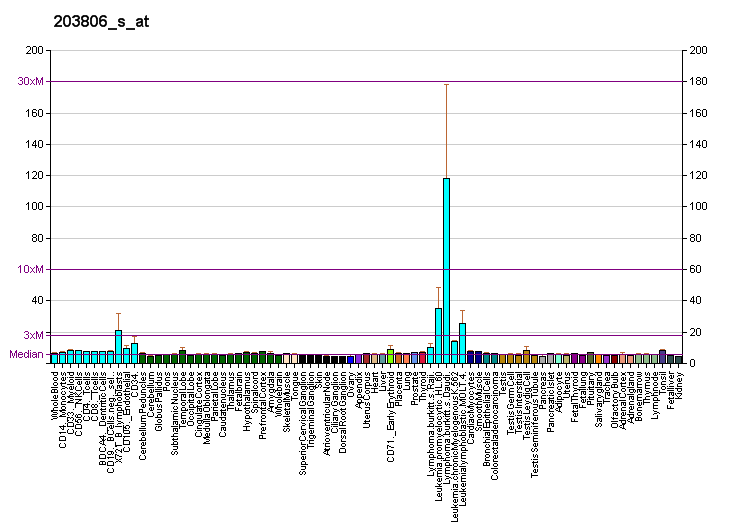
RNA expression pattern
Bgee	Human / Mouse (ortholog); Top expressed in: right testis; ventricular zone; left testis; ganglionic eminence; mucosa of transverse colon; testicle; granulocyte; gonad; monocyte; bone marrow cell / Top expressed in: granulocyte; tail of embryo; medullary collecting duct; ventricular zone; spermatocyte; epiblast; genital tubercle; embryo; yolk sac; blastocyst; More reference expression data
BioGPS	More reference expression data
Gene ontology
Molecular function	protein binding
Cellular component	cytoplasm; Fanconi anaemia nuclear complex; nucleus; nucleoplasm
Biological process	male meiotic nuclear division; male gonad development; regulation of cell population proliferation; interstrand cross-link repair; DNA repair; female gonad development; cellular response to DNA damage stimulus; regulation of DNA-binding transcription factor activity; regulation of CD40 signaling pathway; regulation of regulatory T cell differentiation; regulation of inflammatory response; protein-containing complex assembly
Sources:Amigo / QuickGO
Orthologs
Databases	NCBI: entry; OMA: entry
Species	Human	Mouse
Entrez	2175	14087
Ensembl	ENSG00000187741	ENSMUSG00000032815
UniProt	O15360	Q9JL70
RefSeq (mRNA)	NM_000135; NM_001018112; NM_001286167; NM_001351830	NM_016925
RefSeq (protein)	NP_000126; NP_001018122; NP_001273096; NP_001338759	NP_058621
Location (UCSC)	Chr 16: 89.73 – 89.82 Mb	Chr 8: 124 – 124.05 Mb
PubMed search
- Wikidata
View/Edit Human	View/Edit Mouse

Fanconi anemia group A protein (FANCA), also known as Fanconi anaemia, complementation group A (FAA, FACA), is a protein which in humans is encoded by the FANCA gene. It belongs to the Fanconi anaemia complementation group (FANC) family of genes of which 12 complementation groups are currently recognized and is hypothesised to operate as a post-replication repair or a cell cycle checkpoint. FANCA proteins are involved in inter-strand DNA cross-link repair and in the maintenance of normal chromosome stability that regulates the differentiation of haematopoietic stem cells into mature blood cells.

Mutations involving the FANCA gene are associated with many somatic and congenital defects, primarily involving phenotypic variations of Fanconi anaemia, aplastic anaemia, and forms of cancer such as squamous cell carcinoma and acute myeloid leukaemia.

== Function ==
The Fanconi anaemia complementation group (FANC) currently includes FANCA, FANCB, FANCC, FANCD1 (also called BRCA2), FANCD2, FANCE, FANCF, FANCG, and FANCL. The previously defined group FANCH is the same as FANCA. The members of the Fanconi anaemia complementation group do not share sequence similarity; they are related by their assembly into a common nuclear protein complex. The FANCA gene encodes the protein for complementation group A. Alternative splicing results in multiple transcript variants encoding different isoforms.

Fanconi anaemia group A protein

Identifiers
- Symbol: Fanconi_A
- Pfam: PF03511
- InterPro: IPR003516
Available protein structures:
- PDB: IPR003516 PF03511 (ECOD; PDBsum)
- AlphaFold: IPR003516; PF03511

=== Gene and protein ===
In humans, the gene FANCA is 79 kilobases (kb) in length, and is located on chromosome 16 (16q24.3). The FANCA protein is composed of 1455 amino acids. Within cells, the major purpose of FANCA belongs to its putative involvement in a multisubunit FA complex composed of FANCA, FANCB, FANCC, FANCE, FANCF, FANCG, FANCL/PHF9 and FANCM. In complex with FANCF, FANCG and FANCL, FANCA interacts with HES1. This interaction has been proposed as essential for the stability and nuclear localization of FA core complex proteins. The complex with FANCC and FANCG may also include EIF2AK2 and HSP70. In cells, FANCA involvement in this ‘FA core complex’ is required for the activation of the FANCD2 protein to a monoubiquitinated isoform (FANCD2-Ub) in response to DNA damage, catalysing activation of the FA/BRCA DNA damage-response pathway, leading to repair.

FANCA binds to both single-stranded (ssDNA) and double-stranded (dsDNA) DNAs; however, when tested in an electrophoretic mobility shift assay, its affinity for ssDNA is significantly higher than for dsDNA. FANCA also binds to RNA with a higher affinity than its DNA counterpart. FANCA requires a certain number of nucleotides for optimal binding, with the minimum for FANCA recognition being approximately 30 for both DNA and RNA. Yuan et al. (2012) found through affinity testing FANCA with a variety of DNA structures that a 5'-flap or 5'-tail on DNA facilitates its interaction with FANCA, while the complementing C-terminal fragment of Q772X, C772-1455, retains the differentiated nucleic acid-binding activity (i.e. preferencing RNA before ssDNA and dsDNA), indicating that the nucleic acid-binding domain of FANCA is located primarily at the C terminus, a location where many disease-causing mutations are found.

FANCA is ubiquitously expressed at low levels in all cells with subcellular localisation in primarily nucleus but also cytoplasm corresponding with its putative caretaker role in DNA damage-response pathways, and FA complex formation. The distribution of proteins in different tissues is not well understood currently. Immunochemical study of mouse tissue indicates that FANCA is present at a higher level in lymphoid tissues, the testis and the ovary, and though the significance of this is unclear, it suggests that the presence of FA proteins might be related to cellular proliferation. For example, in human immortalized lymphoblasts and leukaemia cells, FA proteins are readily detectable by immunoprecipitation.

== Clinical significance ==
Mutations in this gene are the most common cause of Fanconi's anaemia. Fanconi anaemia is an inherited autosomal recessive disorder, the main features of which are aplastic anaemia in childhood, multiple congenital abnormalities, susceptibility to leukemia and other cancers, and cellular hypersensitivity to interstrand DNA cross-linking agents. Generally cells from Fanconi anaemia patients show a markedly higher frequency of spontaneous chromosomal breakage and hypersensitivity to the clastogenic effect of DNA cross-linking agents such as diepoxybutane (DEB) and mitomycin-C (MMC) when compared to normal cells. The primary diagnostic test for Fanconi anaemia is based on the increased chromosomal breakage seen in afflicted cells after exposure to these agents – the DEB/MMC stress test. Other features of the Fanconi anaemia cell phenotype also include abnormal cell cycle kinetics (prolonged G2 phase), hypersensitivity to oxygen, increased apoptosis and accelerated telomere shortening.

FANCA mutations are by far the most common cause of Fanconi anaemia, accounting for between 60 and 70% of all cases. FANCA was cloned in 1996 and it is one of the largest FA genes. Hundreds of different mutations have been recorded with 30% point mutations, 30% 1-5 base pair microdeletions or microinsertions, and 40% large deletions, removing up to 31 exons from the gene. These large deletions have a high correlation with specific breakpoints and arise as a result of Alu mediated recombination. A highly relevant observation is that different mutations produce Fanconi anaemia phenotypes of varying severity.

Patients homozygous for null-mutations in this gene have an earlier onset of anaemia than those with mutations that produce an altered or incorrect protein. However, as most patients are compound heterozygotes, diagnostic screening for mutations is difficult. Certain founder mutations can also occur in some populations, such as the deletion exon 12-31 mutation, which accounts for 60% of mutations in Afrikaners.

=== Involvement in FA/BRCA pathway ===
In cells from Fanconi anaemia patients, FA core complex induction of FANCD2 ubiquitination is not observed, assumably a result from impaired complex formation due to the lack of a working FANCA protein. Ultimately, regardless of specific mutation, it is disruption of this FA/BRCA pathway that results in the adverse cellular and clinical phenotypes common to all FANCA-impaired Fanconi anaemia sufferers. Interactions between BRCA1 and many FANC proteins have been investigated. Amongst known FANC proteins, most evidence points for a direct interaction primarily between FANCA protein and BRCA1. Evidence from yeast two-hybrid analysis, coimmunoprecipitation from in vitro synthesis, and coimmunoprecipitation from cell extracts shows that the site of interaction is between the terminal amino group of FANCA and the central part of BRCA1, located within amino acids 740–1083.

However, as FANCA and BRCA1 undergo a constitutive interaction, this may not depend solely on detection of actual DNA damage. Instead BRCA1 protein may be more crucial in the detection of double stranded DNA breaks, or an intermediate in interstrand crosslink (ICL) repair, and rather serve to bring some of the many DNA repair proteins it interacts with to the site. One such protein would be FANCA, which in turn may serve as a docking site or anchor point at the site of ICL damage for the FA core complex. Other FANC proteins, such as FANCC, FANCE and FANCG are then assembled in this nuclear complex in the presence of FANCA as required for the action of FANCD2. This mechanic is also supported by the protein-protein interactions between BRG1 and both BRCA1 and FANCA, that serve to modulate cell-cycle kinetics alongside this. Alternatively, BRCA1 might localize FANCA to the site of DNA damage and then release it to initiate complex formation. The complex would allow ubiquitination of FANCD2, a later functioning protein in the FA path, promoting ICL and DNA repair.

FANCA's emerging putative and clearly integral function within activation the FA core complex also provides an explanation for its particularly high correlation with mutations causing Fanconi anaemia. Whilst many FANC protein mutations account for only 1% of the total observed cases, they are also stabilized by FANCA within the complex. For example, FANCA stabilises FANCG within the core complex, and hence mutations in FANCG are compensated for as the complex can still catalyse FANCD2-ubiquitination further downstream. FANCA upregulation also increases expression of FANCG in cells, and the fact this transduction is not mutual – FANCG upregulation does not cause increased expression of FANCA – suggests that FANCA is not only the primary stabilizing protein in the core complex, but may act as a natural regulator in patients who would otherwise suffer from mutations in FANC genes other than FANCA or FANCD2.

=== Participation in haematopoiesis ===
FANCA is hypothesised to play a crucial role in adult (definitive) haematopoiesis during embryonic development, and is thought to be expressed in all haematopoietic sites that contribute to the formation of haematopoietic stem cells and progenitor cells (HSPCs). Most patients with a mutation develop haematological abnormalities within the first decade of life, and continue to decline until developing its most prevalent adverse effect, pancytopenia, potentially leading to death. In particular many patients develop megaloblastic anaemia around the age of 7, with this macrocytosis being the first haematological marker. Defective in vitro haematopoiesis has been recorded for over two decades resulting from mutated FANCA proteins, in particular developmental defects such as impaired granulomonocytopoiesis due to FANCA mutation.

Studies using clonogenic myeloid progenitors (CFU-GM) have also shown that the frequency of CFU-GM in normal bone marrow increased and their proliferative capacity decreased exponentially with age, with a particularly marked proliferative impairment in Fanconi anaemia afflicted children compared to age-matched healthy controls. As haematopoietic progenitor cell function begins at birth and continues throughout life, it is easily inferred that prolonged incapacitation of FANCA protein production results in total haematopoietic failure in patients.

==== Potential impact on erythroid development ====
The three distinct stages of mammalian erythroid development are primitive, foetal and adult definitive. Adult, or definitive erythrocytes are the most common blood cell type and characteristically most similar across mammalian species. Primitive and foetal erythrocytes however, have markedly different characteristics. These include: they are larger in size (primitive even more so than foetal), circulate during early stages of development with a shorter lifespan, and, in particular, primitive cells are nucleated.

As the reasons for these disparities are not well understood, FANCA may be a gene responsible for instigating these morphological differences when considering its variations in erythrocyte expression. In primitive and foetal erythrocyte precursors, FANCA expression is low, and almost zero during reticulocyte formation. The marginal overall increase in the foetal stage is dwarfed by its sudden increase in expression solely during adult definitive proerythroblast formation. Here, the mean expression increases by 400% compared to foetal and primitive erythrocytes, and covers a huge margin of deviation. As FANCA is heavily implicated in controlling cellular proliferation, and often results in patients developing megaloblastic anaemia around age 7, a haematological disorder marked physically by proliferation-impaired, oversized erythrocytes, it is possible that the size and proliferative discrepancies between primitive, foetal and adult erythroid lineages may be explained by FANCA expression. As FANCA is also linked to cell-cycling and its progression from G2 phase, the stage impaired in megaloblastic anaemia, its expression in definitive proerythroblast development may be an upstream determinant of erythroid size.

=== Implications in cancer ===
FANCA mutations have also been implicated in increased risks of cancer and malignancies. For example, patients with homozygous null-mutations in FANCA have a markedly increased susceptibility to acute myeloid leukaemia. Furthermore, as FANC mutations in general affect DNA repair throughout the body and are predisposed to affect dynamic cell division particularly in bone marrow, it is unsurprising that patients are more likely to develop myelodysplastic syndromes (MDS) and acute myeloid leukaemia.

== Mouse knockout ==
Knockout mice have been generated for FANCA. However, both single and double knockout murine models are healthy, viable, and do not readily show the phenotypic abnormalities typical of human Fanconi anaemia sufferers, such as haematological failure and increased susceptibility to cancers. Other markers such as infertility however still do arise. This can be seen as evidence for a lack of functional redundancy in the FANCA gene-encoded proteins. Murine models instead require induction of typical anaemic phenotypes by elevated dosing with MMC that does not affect wild-type animals, before they can be used experimentally as preclinical models for bone marrow failure and potential stem cell transplant or gene therapies.

Both female and male mice homozygous for a FANCA mutation show hypogonadism and impaired fertility. Homozygous mutant females exhibit premature reproductive senescence and an increased frequency of ovarian cysts.

In spermatocytes, the FANCA protein is ordinarily present at a high level during the pachytene stage of meiosis. This is the stage when chromosomes are fully synapsed, and Holliday junctions are formed and then resolved into recombinants. FANCA mutant males exhibit an increased frequency of mispaired meiotic chromosomes, implying a role for FANCA in meiotic recombination. Also apoptosis is increased in the mutant germ cells. The Fanconi anemia DNA repair pathway appears to play a key role in meiotic recombination and the maintenance of reproductive germ cells.

Loss of FANCA provokes neural progenitor apoptosis during forebrain development, likely related to defective DNA repair. This effect persists in adulthood leading to depletion of the neural stem cell pool with aging. The Fanconi anemia phenotype can be interpreted as a premature aging of stem cells, DNA damages being the driving force of aging. (Also see DNA damage theory of aging.)

== Interactions ==
FANCA has been shown to interact with:

- BRCA1,
- CHUK,
- ERCC4,
- FANCE,
- FANCF,
- FANCG,
- FANCC,
- IKK2,
- SMARCA4
- SNX5
- SPTAN1 and
- HES1
