= Diepoxybutane =

Names
- Preferred IUPAC name 2,2′-Bioxirane
- Other names 1,1′-Bi[ethylene oxide]; 1,2:3,4-Diepoxybutane; 1,3-Butadiene diepoxide; Bioxirane; Butadiene dioxide; Butane diepoxide; Dioxybutadiene

Identifiers
CAS Number	1464-53-5 (isomeric mixture); 298-18-0 (D/L); 30419-67-1 (D); 30031-64-2 (L); 564-00-1 (meso)
3D model (JSmol)	Interactive image
Abbreviations	DEB
Beilstein Reference	79831
ChEBI	CHEBI:23704
ChEMBL	ChEMBL1964283
ChemSpider	21106504
ECHA InfoCard	100.014.527
EC Number	206-060-6 215-979-1
PubChem CID	11254
UNII	60OB65YNAB (isomeric mixture); GQK28B9ZWF (D/L); 4KEO88VB9L (D); FZ22S4GMHX (L); 2PFZ3Z96CY (meso)
UN number	3384 3082
CompTox Dashboard (EPA)	DTXSID0041307
- InChI: InChI=1S/C4H6O2/c1-3(5-1)4-2-6-4/h3-4H,1-2H2 Key: ZFIVKAOQEXOYFY-UHFFFAOYSA-N; InChI=1/C4H6O2/c1-3(5-1)4-2-6-4/h3-4H,1-2H2 Key: ZFIVKAOQEXOYFY-UHFFFAOYAG
- SMILES: C1OC1C2CO2

Properties
Chemical formula	C_{4}H_{6}O_{2}
Molar mass	86.090 g·mol^{−1}
Appearance	colorless oil
Density	1.113 g/cm^{3} (18 °C)
Melting point	4 °C (39 °F; 277 K)
Boiling point	138 °C (280 °F; 411 K)
Solubility in water	Miscible
Vapor pressure	0.52 kPa (at 20 °C)

Hazards
- GHS labelling
Pictograms	(GHS02: Flammable) (GHS05: Corrosive) (GHS06: Toxic) (GHS08: Health hazard)
Signal word	Danger
Hazard statements	H226, H301, H310, H311, H314, H330, H340, H350
Precautionary statements	P201, P202, P210, P233, P240, P241, P242, P243, P260, P262, P264, P270, P271, P280, P281, P284, P301+P310, P301+P330+P331, P302+P350, P302+P352, P303+P361+P353, P304+P340, P305+P351+P338, P308+P313, P310, P312, P320, P321, P330, P361, P363, P370+P378, P403+P233, P403+P235, P405, P501
Flash point	46 °C (115 °F; 319 K)
- Except where otherwise noted, data are given for materials in their standard state (at 25 °C [77 °F], 100 kPa). Infobox references

Diepoxybutane describes organic compounds with the formula (CHOCH_{2})_{2}. Three isomers are possible, a pair of enantiomers and a meso isomer. These compounds represent the simplest double epoxide. The isomers a colorless liquids.

Diepoxybutane is used as a chemical intermediate, as a cross-linking agent for polymers and textiles, and as a preservative.

t is prepared by ring closing reactions from an acetal derived from threitol.

== Reactions and uses ==
It reacts with Grignard reagents to undergo ring-opening reactions.

Diepoxybutane is prone to polymerization.

Diepoxybutane (DEB test) to screen for Fanconi anemia (FA) among patients with bone marrow failure syndromes.

DEB effects DNA crosslinking.

== Toxicity and hazards ==
Diepoxybutane irritates the nose, throat and lungs, causing coughing and shortness of breath. Skin exposure can cause chemical burns. Longer exposure periods can cause pulmonary edema, and damage to the liver and kidneys.
