= BRIP1 =

Mammalian protein found in Homo sapiens

Identifiers
- Aliases: BRIP1, BACH1, FANCJ, OF, BRCA1 interacting protein C-terminal helicase 1, BRCA1 interacting helicase 1
- External IDs: OMIM: 605882; MGI: 2442836; GeneCards: BRIP1
Available structures
| PDB | Ortholog search: PDBe RCSB |
| PDB | List of PDB id codes 1T15, 1T29, 3AL3 |
Enzyme activity
| EC # | BRENDA | ExPASy | KEGG | MetaCyc |
|---|---|---|---|---|
| 5.6.2.3 | ↗ | ↗ | ↗ | ↗ |

Gene location (Human)
| Chr. | Chromosome 17 (human) |
| Band | 17q23.2 | Start | 61,679,139 bp |
| Band | 17q23.2 | End | 61,863,559 bp |

Gene location (Mouse)
| Chr. | Chromosome 11 (mouse) |
| Band | 11|11 C | Start | 85,948,964 bp |
| Band | 11|11 C | End | 86,092,019 bp |
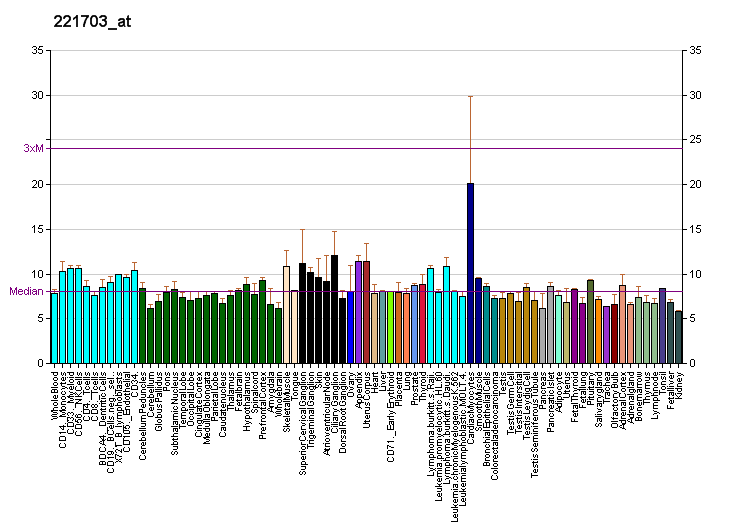
RNA expression pattern
| Bgee | Human / Mouse (ortholog); Top expressed in: ventricular zone; gonad; testicle; secondary oocyte; ganglionic eminence; stromal cell of endometrium; bone marrow; bone marrow cell; trabecular bone; left testis / Top expressed in: zygote; primary oocyte; genital tubercle; tail of embryo; secondary oocyte; yolk sac; morula; gray matter layer of cerebellum; ventricular zone; spermatid; More reference expression data |
| BioGPS | More reference expression data |
Gene ontology
| Molecular function | DNA binding; 4 iron, 4 sulfur cluster binding; nucleotide binding; helicase activity; iron-sulfur cluster binding; DNA helicase activity; metal ion binding; hydrolase activity, acting on acid anhydrides, in phosphorus-containing anhydrides; protein binding; nucleic acid binding; hydrolase activity; ATP binding; chromatin binding |
| Cellular component | cytoplasm; nuclear membrane; nucleoplasm; nucleus |
| Biological process | regulation of transcription by RNA polymerase II; DNA damage checkpoint signaling; cellular response to DNA damage stimulus; cellular response to vitamin; nucleobase-containing compound metabolic process; negative regulation of cell population proliferation; DNA replication; DNA duplex unwinding; double-strand break repair; DNA repair; homologous chromosome pairing at meiosis; spermatogenesis; spermatogonial cell division; spermatid development; male gonad development; response to toxic substance; negative regulation of gene expression; meiotic DNA double-strand break processing involved in reciprocal meiotic recombination; chiasma assembly; cellular response to hypoxia; seminiferous tubule development; cellular response to angiotensin; double-strand break repair involved in meiotic recombination; nucleotide-excision repair; regulation of signal transduction by p53 class mediator |
Sources:Amigo / QuickGO
Orthologs
| Databases | NCBI: entry; OMA: entry |
| Species | Human | Mouse |
| Entrez | 83990 | 237911 |
| Ensembl | ENSG00000136492 | ENSMUSG00000034329 |
| UniProt | Q9BX63 | Q5SXJ3 |
| RefSeq (mRNA) | NM_032043 | NM_178309 |
| RefSeq (protein) | NP_114432 | NP_840094 |
| Location (UCSC) | Chr 17: 61.68 – 61.86 Mb | Chr 11: 85.95 – 86.09 Mb |
| PubMed search |
- Wikidata
| View/Edit Human | View/Edit Mouse |

Fanconi anemia group J protein (FANCJ) is a protein that in humans is encoded by the BRCA1-interacting protein 1 (BRIP1) gene. The protein is a 5'-3' DNA helicase (EC: 5.2.6.3) and ATPase that repairs interstrand crosslinks (ICLs), double-stranded breaks (DSBs) and guanine quadruplexes (G4) through the Fanconi anemia (FA) pathway. Damage or depletion of BRIP1 has been associated with various cancers as well as Fanconi anemia.

== Function ==
=== Cell Cycle ===
The protein encoded by this gene is a member of the RecQ DEAH helicase family. The protein acts as both a 5'-3' DNA helicase and ATPase. The ATPase functionality of BRIP1 is important for entry into and timely progression through the S phase in the cell cycle. ATPase activity is diminished during the G_{1} phase, and is increased during S and G2-M when the protein is phosphorylated at Ser-990. Additionally, depletion of BRIP1 has been observed to delay entry into the S phase.

BRIP1 is also important for the arrest after G2 before mitosis induced by ionizing radiation (IR) - a mechanism often utilized in cancer treatment. In cells where BRIP1 is depleted or damaged, cells do not arrest after G2 and instead progress into mitosis. BRIP1 also interacts with breast cancer type 1 susceptibility protein (BRCA1), a tumor suppressor, by binding to the C terminus between repeats in the BRCT domain. Like the ATPase activity, this interaction depends on phosphorylation at Ser-990. This interaction is also required for IR-induced arrest at G2-M.

=== DNA Repair ===
BRIP1 protein is a DNA helicase that is employed in homologous recombinational repair, and in the response of the cell to DNA replication stress. In part, BRIP1 carries out its function through interaction with other key DNA repair proteins, specifically MLH1, BRCA1 and BLM. This group of proteins helps to ensuring genome stability, and in particular repairs DNA double-strand breaks during prophase 1 of meiosis.

5'-3' DNA-helicase activity in BRIP1 is dependent on its ATPase activity. BRIP1 preferentially binds to DNA at forked duplexes, and can unwind duplexes with 5' tails of at least 15 nucleotides. BRIP1 can however also bind to 5' flap, D-loop and guanine quadruplex (G4) structures. Functionality as a DNA-helicase allows BRIP1 to repair interstrand crosslinks (ICLs) via the Fanconi Anemia (FA) pathway. As such, cells without BRIP1 have increased sensitivity to ICL inducing agents. If not repaired, ICLs can lead to a stall in the replication fork. The ability of BRIP1 to repair ICLs is dependent not on BRCA1, but interaction with MLH1, however the exact nature of this dependence is uncertain. Furthermore, it is unclear the exact role BRIP1 plays in ICL repair.

In mammals, BRIP1 is also thought to play a role in the repair of double-stranded breaks (DSBs) in DNA through interaction with BRCA1, which plays a major role in DSB repair. It has been observed that DSB repair is delayed in cells with depleted or damaged BRIP1. BRIP1 additionally helps recruit CtIP to DSB break sections, and helps ensure proper 5' end resection. BRIP1 may be a target of germline cancer-inducing mutations.

BRIP1 plays a role in the repair of G4 structures in DNA, which can lead to deletions when not repaired. BRIP1 hydrolyzes ATP to unwind these complexes - a process that appears to be unrelated to its function in the FA pathway. BRIP1 appears to have an important role in neuronal cells by suppressing oxidative stress, excitotoxicity induced DNA damage, and in protecting the integrity of mitochondria. A deficiency of BRIP1 causes increased DNA damage, mitochondrial abnormalities and neuronal cell death.

=== Meiosis ===
During prophase I of meiosis in male mice, BRIP1 functions in the repair of DNA double-strand breaks, but does not appear to have a role in the formation of chromosomal crossovers. BRIP1 co-localizes with TOPBP1 scaffold protein and the BRCA1 repair protein along chromosome cores starting early in meiotic prophase I forming discrete foci, and is also densely localized to the axes of unsynapsed chromosomes during the late zygonema (zygotene) stage of meiosis.

The protein encoded by this gene is a member of the RecQ DEAH helicase family and interacts with the BRCT repeats of breast cancer, type 1 (BRCA1). The bound complex is important in the normal double-strand break repair function of breast cancer, type 1 (BRCA1). This gene may be a target of germline cancer-inducing mutations.

== Structure ==
BRIP1 is a 1249 residue polypeptide and a member of the DEAH family of helicases, as characterized by seven motifs in its structure common to this family (I, Ia, II, III, IV, V, VI) ^{[5]}. Like other members of this family, it moves continuously along DNA and removes strands and proteins in its path. It also contains a nuclear localization signal from positions 158-175, and an Fe-S domain between helicase motifs Ia and II, which is essential for helicase activity.

BRIP1 has several different domains for interacting with BRCA1, and MutL𝛼, as well as ATP and DNA substrates. An 888-residue structure at the N-terminus makes up the ATPase and helicase domain, which encapsulates all aforementioned motifs. The BRCA1 binding site sits outside this domain in the C-terminus between residues 976-1006. It includes a S-X-X-F motif required for interaction with BRCA1. Two MutL𝛼 interaction domains are within the helicase domain - one between motifs II and III and another between motifs V and VI.

Several important amino acids have been identified in BRIP1. The lysine at position 52 is required for hydrolyzing ATP, and is conserved across many ATPases and helicases. The proline at position 47 (P47) and the methionine at position 299 (M299) are both important for ATPase activity, with P47 also impacting helicase activity and overall enzyme stability. A mutation at P47 diminishes stability and activity as both an ATPase and helicase, while a M299I mutation appears to increase ATPase activity. MLH1 interaction is enabled by lysines at 141 and 142, and BRCA1 interaction is enabled by P991 and F993 in addition to phosphorylation at S990.

Mutations in BRIP1 have been linked to breast cancer, Fanconi anemia, and ovarian cancer. R251C and Q255H mutations inhibit helicase activity and have been associated with Fanconi anemia, while the M299I has been associated with breast cancer. Additionally, a A349P mutation inhibits the enzyme's ability to displace proteins from DNA strands, and reduces resistance to DNA damage. Mutations in BRIP1 are associated with a 10-15% risk of ovarian cancer.

BRIP1 proteins in different animals vary in homology to human BRIP1. Proteins isolated from chickens and nematodes (54% and 31% homology to human BRIP1 respectively) were both missing the S-X-X-F motif required for BRCA1 interaction. As such, BRIP1 is unlikely to play a role in BRCA1-dependent DSB repair in these organisms.

== Interactions ==
BRIP1 has been shown to interact with BRCA1.
