= POLR1A =

Protein-coding gene in the species Homo sapiens

Identifiers
- Aliases: POLR1A, A190, RPA1, RPA194, RPO1-4, RPO14, AFDCIN, polymerase (RNA) I subunit A, RNA polymerase I subunit A, RPA190
- External IDs: OMIM: 616404; MGI: 1096397; GeneCards: POLR1A
Enzyme activity
| EC # | BRENDA | ExPASy | KEGG | MetaCyc |
|---|---|---|---|---|
| 2.7.7.6 | ↗ | ↗ | ↗ | ↗ |

Gene location (Human)
| Chr. | Chromosome 2 (human) |
| Band | 2p11.2 | Start | 86,020,216 bp |
| Band | 2p11.2 | End | 86,106,155 bp |

Gene location (Mouse)
| Chr. | Chromosome 6 (mouse) |
| Band | 6 C1|6 32.21 cM | Start | 71,886,037 bp |
| Band | 6 C1|6 32.21 cM | End | 71,961,919 bp |
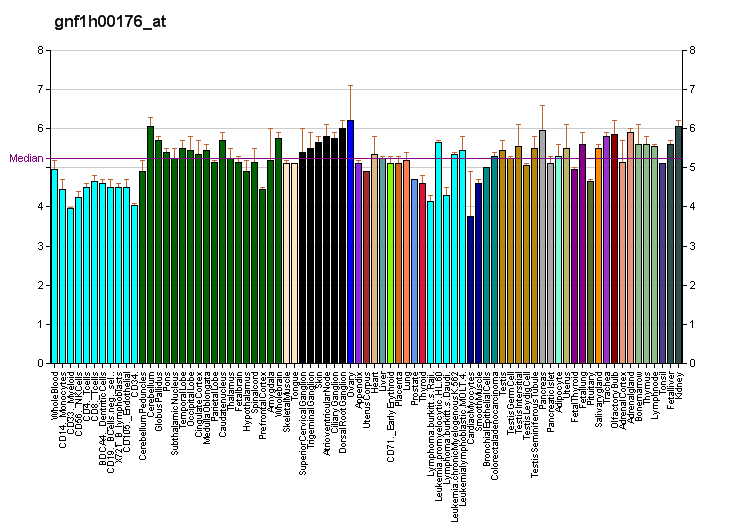
RNA expression pattern
| Bgee | Human / Mouse (ortholog); Top expressed in: sural nerve; tibialis anterior muscle; stromal cell of endometrium; gonad; testicle; islet of Langerhans; ventricular zone; gastrocnemius muscle; muscle of thigh; body of uterus / Top expressed in: granulocyte; tail of embryo; epiblast; choroid plexus of fourth ventricle; primitive streak; genital tubercle; Epithelium of choroid plexus; yolk sac; spermatocyte; ventricular zone; More reference expression data |
| BioGPS | More reference expression data |
Gene ontology
| Molecular function | transferase activity; DNA binding; nucleotidyltransferase activity; zinc ion binding; metal ion binding; DNA-directed 5'-3' RNA polymerase activity; protein binding; RNA polymerase I activity; chromatin binding |
| Cellular component | nucleoplasm; RNA polymerase I complex; nucleus; nucleolus |
| Biological process | termination of RNA polymerase I transcription; epigenetic maintenance of chromatin in transcription-competent conformation; transcription initiation from RNA polymerase I promoter; transcription, DNA-templated; negative regulation of protein localization to nucleolus; transcription elongation from RNA polymerase I promoter |
Sources:Amigo / QuickGO
Orthologs
| Databases | NCBI: entry; OMA: entry |
| Species | Human | Mouse |
| Entrez | 25885 | 20019 |
| Ensembl | ENSG00000068654 | ENSMUSG00000049553 |
| UniProt | O95602 | O35134 |
| RefSeq (mRNA) | NM_015425 | NM_009088 |
| RefSeq (protein) | NP_056240 | NP_033114 |
| Location (UCSC) | Chr 2: 86.02 – 86.11 Mb | Chr 6: 71.89 – 71.96 Mb |
| PubMed search |
- Wikidata
| View/Edit Human | View/Edit Mouse |

DNA-directed RNA polymerase I subunit RPA1 is an enzyme that in humans is encoded by the POLR1A gene.
