= PALB2 =

Protein-coding gene in the species Homo sapiens

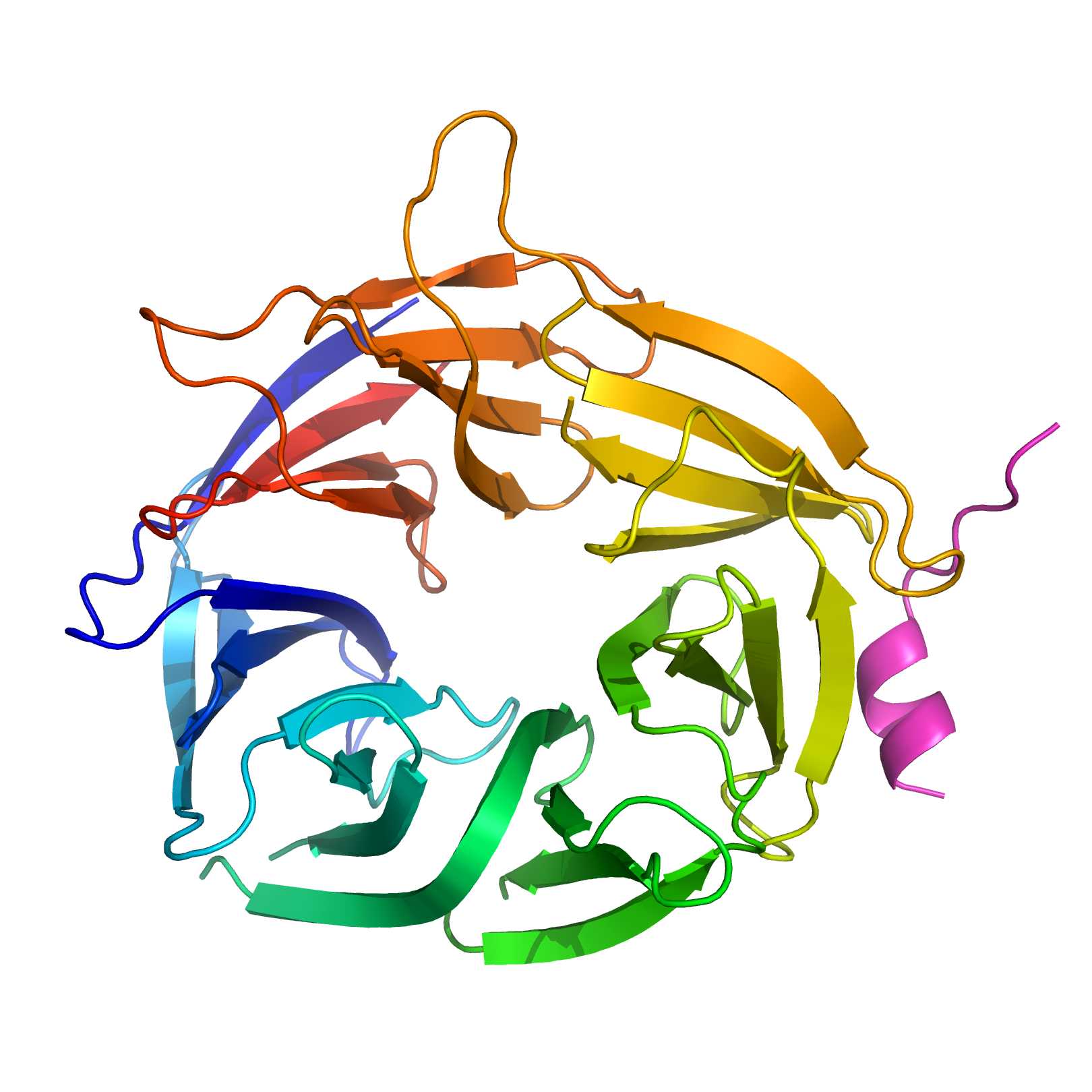

Identifiers
- Aliases: PALB2, FANCN, PNCA3, partner and localizer of BRCA2
- External IDs: OMIM: 610355; MGI: 3040695; GeneCards: PALB2
Available structures
PDB	Ortholog search: PDBe RCSB
PDB	List of PDB id codes 2W18, 3EU7

Gene location (Human)
Chr.	Chromosome 16 (human)
Band	16p12.2	Start	23,603,160 bp
Band	16p12.2	End	23,641,310 bp

Gene location (Mouse)
Chr.	Chromosome 7 (mouse)
Band	7|7 F2	Start	121,706,485 bp
Band	7|7 F2	End	121,732,208 bp
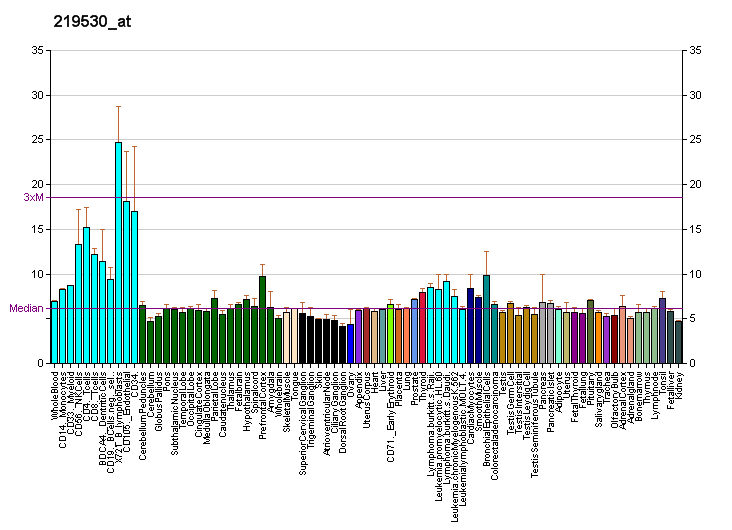
RNA expression pattern
Bgee	Human / Mouse (ortholog); Top expressed in: secondary oocyte; buccal mucosa cell; gonad; testicle; Achilles tendon; ventricular zone; gingival epithelium; ganglionic eminence; amniotic fluid; mucosa of transverse colon / Top expressed in: zygote; secondary oocyte; primary oocyte; tail of embryo; hand; epiblast; spermatocyte; embryo; genital tubercle; yolk sac; More reference expression data
BioGPS	More reference expression data
Gene ontology
Molecular function	DNA binding; protein binding
Cellular component	nucleoplasm; nucleus
Biological process	animal organ morphogenesis; somitogenesis; post-anal tail morphogenesis; cellular response to DNA damage stimulus; DNA recombination; mesoderm development; negative regulation of apoptotic process; in utero embryonic development; multicellular organism growth; embryonic organ development; inner cell mass cell proliferation; DNA repair; double-strand break repair via homologous recombination
Sources:Amigo / QuickGO
Orthologs
Databases	NCBI: entry; OMA: entry
Species	Human	Mouse
Entrez	79728	233826
Ensembl	ENSG00000083093	ENSMUSG00000044702
UniProt	Q86YC2	Q3U0P1
RefSeq (mRNA)	NM_024675	NM_001081238; NM_001289842; NM_001289843; NM_001289844; NM_001289845 NM_172744
RefSeq (protein)	NP_078951	NP_001074707; NP_001276771; NP_001276772; NP_001276773; NP_001276774
Location (UCSC)	Chr 16: 23.6 – 23.64 Mb	Chr 7: 121.71 – 121.73 Mb
PubMed search
- Wikidata
View/Edit Human	View/Edit Mouse

Partner and localizer of BRCA2, also known as PALB2 or FANCN, is a protein which in humans is encoded by the PALB2 gene.

== Function ==
Characterized domaines of PALB2

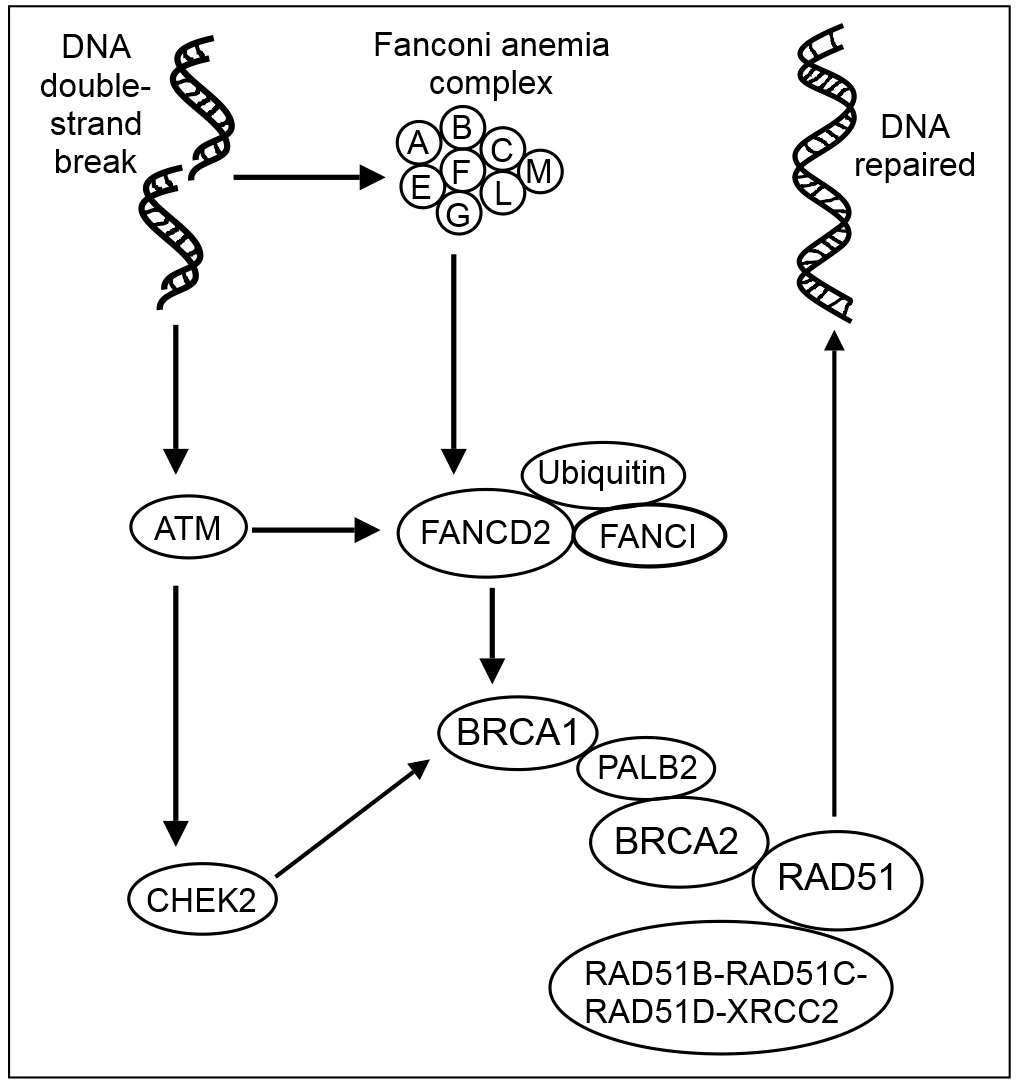
Recombinational repair of DNA double-strand damage - some key steps. ATM (ATM) is a protein kinase that is recruited and activated by DNA double-strand breaks. DNA double-strand damages also activate the Fanconi anemia core complex (FANCA/B/C/E/F/G/L/M). The FA core complex monoubiquitinates the downstream targets FANCD2 and FANCI. ATM activates (phosphorylates) CHEK2 and FANCD2 CHEK2 phosphorylates BRCA1. Ubiquinated FANCD2 complexes with BRCA1 and RAD51. The PALB2 protein acts as a hub, bringing together BRCA1, BRCA2 and RAD51 at the site of a DNA double-strand break, and also binds to RAD51C, a member of the RAD51 paralog complex RAD51B-RAD51C-RAD51D-XRCC2 (BCDX2). The BCDX2 complex is responsible for RAD51 recruitment or stabilization at damage sites. RAD51 plays a major role in homologous recombinational repair of DNA during double strand break repair. In this process, an ATP dependent DNA strand exchange takes place in which a single strand invades base-paired strands of homologous DNA molecules. RAD51 is involved in the search for homology and strand pairing stages of the process.

This gene encodes a protein that functions in genome maintenance (double strand break repair). This protein binds to and colocalizes with the breast cancer 2 early onset protein (BRCA2) in nuclear foci and likely permits the stable intranuclear localization and accumulation of BRCA2. PALB2 binds the single strand DNA and directly interacts with the recombinase RAD51 to stimulate strand invasion, a vital step of homologous recombination, PALB2 can function synergistically with a BRCA2 chimera (termed piccolo, or piBRCA2) to further promote strand invasion.

== Clinical significance ==
Variants in the PALB2 gene are associated with an increased risk of developing breast cancer of magnitude similar to that associated with BRCA2 mutations and PALB2-deficient cells are sensitive to PARP inhibitors.

PALB2 was recently identified as a susceptibility gene for familial pancreatic cancer by scientists at the Sol Goldman Pancreatic Cancer Research Center at Johns Hopkins. This has paved for the way for developing a new gene test for families where pancreatic cancer occurs in multiple family members. Tests for PALB2 have been developed by Ambry Genetics and Myriad Genetics that are now available.

Prophylactic mastectomy should be considered for women that had breast cancer and a PALB2 mutation.

Biallelic mutations in PALB2 (also known as FANCN), similar to biallelic BRCA2 mutations, cause Fanconi anemia.

Mutations in this gene have been associated with an increased risk of ovarian, breast and pancreatic cancer.

== Meiosis ==
PALB2 mutant male mice have reduced fertility. This reduced fertility appears to be due to germ cell attrition resulting from a combination of unrepaired DNA breaks during meiosis and defective synapsis of the X and Y chromosomes. The function of homologous recombination during meiosis appears to be repair of DNA damages, particularly double-strand breaks (also see Origin and function of meiosis). The PALB2-BRCA1 interaction is likely important for repairing such damages during male meiosis.

== See also ==
- Fanconi anemia
- BRCA2
- DNA repair
- Tumor suppressor gene
