= Fanconi anemia group E protein =

Protein-coding gene in the species Homo sapiens

FANCE
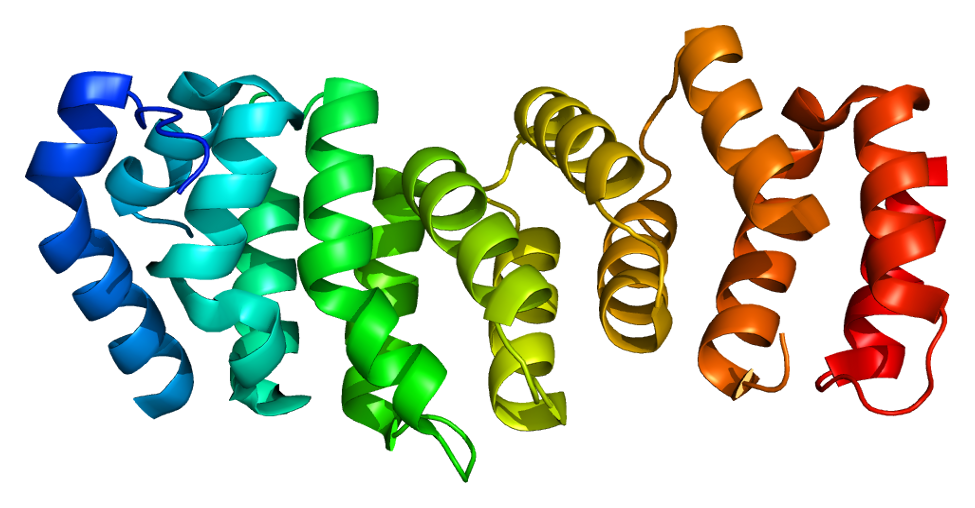

Identifiers
- Aliases: FANCE, FACE, FAE, Fanconi anemia complementation group E, FA complementation group E
- External IDs: OMIM: 613976; MGI: 1920025; GeneCards: FANCE
Available structures
PDB	Human UniProt search: PDBe RCSB
PDB	List of PDB id codes 2ILR

Gene location (Human)
Chr.	Chromosome 6 (human)
Band	6p21.31	Start	35,452,338 bp
Band	6p21.31	End	35,467,104 bp

Gene location (Mouse)
Chr.	Chromosome 17 (mouse)
Band	17|17 A3.3	Start	28,532,493 bp
Band	17|17 A3.3	End	28,545,546 bp
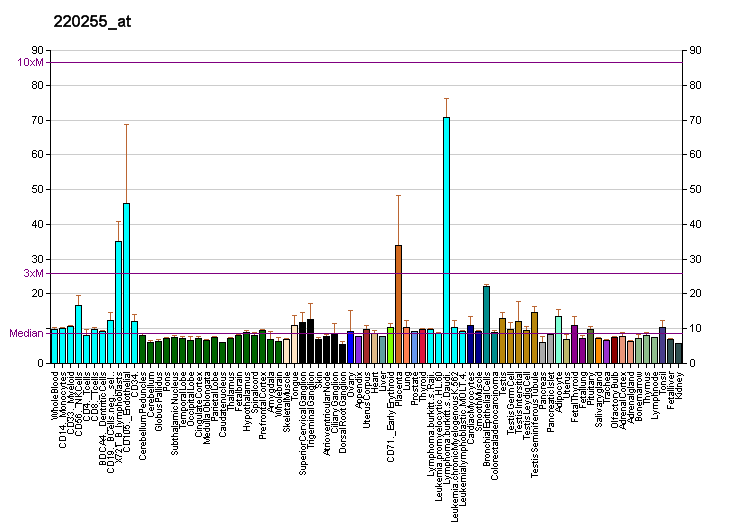
RNA expression pattern
Bgee	Human / Mouse (ortholog); Top expressed in: buccal mucosa cell; oocyte; secondary oocyte; gonad; popliteal artery; tibial arteries; skin of abdomen; skin of leg; testicle; gastrocnemius muscle / Top expressed in: neural layer of retina; lip; embryo; embryo; genital tubercle; tail of embryo; morula; ventricular zone; visual cortex; epiblast; More reference expression data
BioGPS	More reference expression data
Gene ontology
Molecular function	molecular function; protein binding
Cellular component	Fanconi anaemia nuclear complex; nucleus; nucleoplasm
Biological process	interstrand cross-link repair; cellular response to DNA damage stimulus; DNA repair
Sources:Amigo / QuickGO
Orthologs
Databases	NCBI: entry; OMA: entry
Species	Human	Mouse
Entrez	2178	72775
Ensembl	ENSG00000112039	ENSMUSG00000007570
UniProt	Q9HB96	n/a
RefSeq (mRNA)	NM_021922	NM_001163819; NM_001163820; NM_028348
RefSeq (protein)	NP_068741	n/a
Location (UCSC)	Chr 6: 35.45 – 35.47 Mb	Chr 17: 28.53 – 28.55 Mb
PubMed search
- Wikidata
View/Edit Human	View/Edit Mouse

Fanconi anemia group E protein is a protein that in humans is encoded by the FANCE gene. The Fanconi anemia complementation group (FANC) currently includes FANCA, FANCB, FANCC, FANCD1 (also called BRCA2), FANCD2, FANCE, FANCF, FANCG, and FANCL. Fanconi anemia is a genetically heterogeneous recessive disorder characterized by cytogenetic instability, hypersensitivity to DNA cross-linking agents, increased chromosomal breakage, and defective DNA repair. The members of the Fanconi anemia complementation group do not share sequence similarity; they are related by their assembly into a common nuclear protein complex. This gene encodes the protein for complementation groufcrp E.

A nuclear complex containing FANCE protein (as well as FANCC, FANCF and FANCG) is essential for the activation of the FANCD2 protein to the mono-ubiquitinated isoform. In normal, non-mutant cells, FANCD2 is mono-ubiquinated in response to DNA damage. FANCE together with FANCC acts as the substrate adapter for this reaction Activated FANCD2 protein co-localizes with BRCA1 (breast cancer susceptibility protein) at ionizing radiation-induced foci and in synaptonemal complexes of meiotic chromosomes. Activated FANCD2 protein may function prior to the initiation of meiotic recombination, perhaps to prepare chromosomes for synapses, or to regulate subsequent recombination events.

== Gene Expression ==
FANCE is stated to have been expressed in 151 organs with the highest level in female gonads.

== Chromosomal Location ==
The location of the gene is in 6p21.31, where p is the short arm of chromosome 6 at position 21.31

The location at molecular level is in base pairs 35,452,339 to 35,467,106 on chromosome 6 (Homo sapiens Annotation Release 109, GRCh38.p12)

== Protein Characteristics ==
The main complex of FA contains a nuclear multi-subunit complex of notably 8 FA proteins. This adds a single ubiquitin chain to the FANCD2 following DNA damage or duplicative pressure.

For the collection of FANCC, FANCE is important in the nucleus and gathering of the core complex. Some characteristics of FANCE are that it can set itself up with ubiquitinated FANCD2, BRCA2 and constructed nuclear foci. Also, as it is the only member showing direct union with FANCD2 and gives the needed links between FA core complex and FANCD2.

The structure of FANCE has an epitope on its surface that is found to be important for its binding with FANCD2. The existence of recurrent helical motif was not clear when analysis of amino acids was done.

=== Protein Structure ===
It consists of 13 α-helices, 1 3_{10}-helix and no β-strand. Long shaped, non-globular shape and 70 Å n size. Width of 30 Å and thickness 20 Å. The protein folds continuously in right-handed manner from N- to C- terminal. Identifying it is easy because of its helices at the end of C-end.

== Function ==
It restores DNA cross-links and is needed for nuclear accumulation of FANCC, delivering a critical bridge between FA complex and FANCD2.

FANCE-deficient mice exhibit a reduced number of oocytes and disruption of prophase I of meiosis indicating that FANCE has an essential role in meiosis.

== Applications ==
- FANCE has its application in Western Blot and IHC-P (Immunohistochemistry) where the predicted molecular weight was 58 kDa in Western blot and antigen recovery with citrate buffer pH6 was done before the onset of IHC-P.
- FANCE is also used in Gene Mapping, here homozygosity mapping, where it is fused with 3 DNA cells that will help in calculating the sensitivity to composites of Mitomycin C, a DNA cross-linking agent (Sigma). It also then examines the use of micro satellite markers D6S422 and D6S1610, for linking. From this, a chromosomal region on chromosome 6p is located for FANCE.
- Immunoblotting showed that FANCE-L348M and FANCE-E263K mutants showed a division in the nuclear membrane of FA-E EUFA409 LCL indicating that irrespective of FANCE having putative nuclear localization signals, it limits primarily to the nucleus.

== Interactions ==
FANCE has been shown to interact with:

- FANCA,
- FANCD2,
- FANCF
- FANCG, and
- FANCC.
