= Fanconi anemia group C protein =

Protein-coding gene in the species Homo sapiens

FANCC

Identifiers
- Aliases: FANCC, Fancc, Facc, FA3, FAC, mir-3074-1, FACC, Fanconi anemia complementation group C, FA complementation group C
- External IDs: OMIM: 613899; MGI: 95480; GeneCards: FANCC

Gene location (Human)
Chr.	Chromosome 9 (human)
Band	9q22.32	Start	95,099,054 bp
Band	9q22.32	End	95,426,796 bp

Gene location (Mouse)
Chr.	Chromosome 13 (mouse)
Band	13 B3|13 32.8 cM	Start	63,432,857 bp
Band	13 B3|13 32.8 cM	End	63,645,092 bp
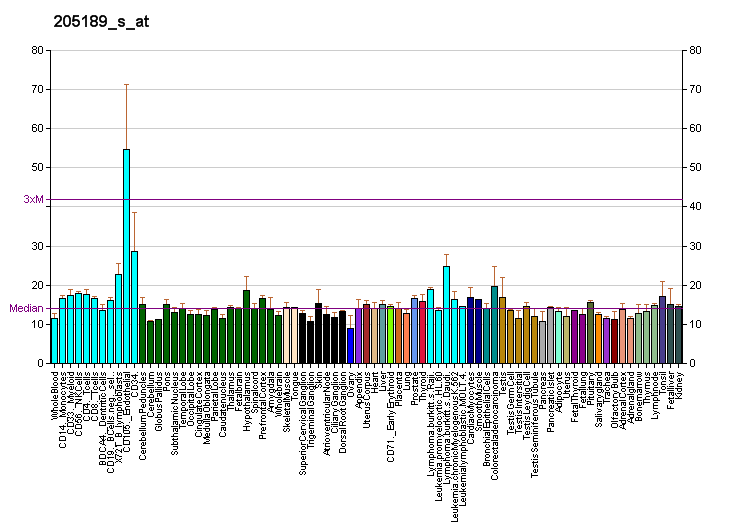
RNA expression pattern
Bgee	Human / Mouse (ortholog); Top expressed in: pancreatic ductal cell; right lobe of liver; testicle; gonad; right testis; left testis; sural nerve; cerebellar hemisphere; right hemisphere of cerebellum; Achilles tendon / Top expressed in: zygote; secondary oocyte; extensor digitorum longus muscle; cardiac muscle tissue of left ventricle; ilium; plantaris muscle; corneal stroma; primary oocyte; interventricular septum; Ileal epithelium; More reference expression data
BioGPS	More reference expression data
Gene ontology
Molecular function	protein binding
Cellular component	cytoplasm; cytosol; Fanconi anaemia nuclear complex; nucleus; nucleoplasm
Biological process	interstrand cross-link repair; DNA repair; cellular response to DNA damage stimulus; myeloid cell homeostasis; nucleotide-excision repair; gamete generation; germ cell development; removal of superoxide radicals; cellular response to oxidative stress; brain morphogenesis; neuronal stem cell population maintenance; protein-containing complex assembly
Sources:Amigo / QuickGO
Orthologs
Databases	NCBI: entry; OMA: entry
Species	Human	Mouse
Entrez	2176	14088
Ensembl	ENSG00000158169	ENSMUSG00000021461
UniProt	Q00597	P50652
RefSeq (mRNA)	NM_000136; NM_001243743; NM_001243744	NM_001042673; NM_001282942; NM_007985; NM_001347514; NM_001347515
RefSeq (protein)	NP_000127; NP_001230672; NP_001230673	NP_001036138; NP_001269871; NP_001334443; NP_001334444; NP_032011
Location (UCSC)	Chr 9: 95.1 – 95.43 Mb	Chr 13: 63.43 – 63.65 Mb
PubMed search
- Wikidata
View/Edit Human	View/Edit Mouse

Fanconi anemia group C protein is a protein that in humans is encoded by the FANCC gene. This protein delays the onset of apoptosis and promotes homologous recombination repair of damaged DNA. Mutations in this gene result in Fanconi anemia, a human rare disorder characterized by cancer susceptibility and cellular sensitivity to DNA crosslinks and other damages.

== Structure ==
Fanconi anaemia group C protein

Identifiers
- Symbol: Fanconi_C
- Pfam: PF02106
- InterPro: IPR000686
Available protein structures:
- PDB: IPR000686 PF02106 (ECOD; PDBsum)
- AlphaFold: IPR000686; PF02106

== Function ==
A nuclear complex containing FANCC protein (as well as FANCA, FANCF and FANCG) is essential for the activation of the FANCD2 protein to the mono-ubiquitinated isoform. In normal, non-mutant, cells FANCD2 is mono-ubiquinated in response to DNA damage. FANCC together with FANCE acts as the substrate adaptor for this reaction Activated FANCD2 protein co-localizes with BRCA1 (breast cancer susceptibility protein) at ionizing radiation-induced foci and in synaptonemal complexes of meiotic chromosomes. Activated FANCD2 protein may function prior to the initiation of meiotic recombination, perhaps to prepare chromosomes for synapsis, or to regulate subsequent recombination events.

FANCC(-/-) mutant male and female mice have compromised gametogenesis, leading to markedly impaired fertility, a characteristic of Fanconi anemia patients. Both male and female FANCC mutant mice have reduced numbers of germ cells.

== Interactions ==
Fanconi anemia, complementation group C has been shown to interact with:

- Cdk1,
- FANCA,
- FANCE,
- FANCF,
- GSTP1,
- HSPA1A,
- SPTAN1,
- STAT1, and
- ZBTB32.
