= Protein ZGRF1 =

Protein-coding gene in the species Homo sapiens

ZGRF1

Identifiers
- Aliases: ZGRF1, C4orf21, zinc finger GRF-type containing 1
- External IDs: MGI: 1918893; GeneCards: ZGRF1
Enzyme activity
EC #	BRENDA	ExPASy	KEGG	MetaCyc
5.6.2.3	↗	↗	↗	↗

Gene location (Human)
Chr.	Chromosome 4 (human)
Band	4q25	Start	112,539,333 bp
Band	4q25	End	112,636,995 bp

Gene location (Mouse)
Chr.	Chromosome 3 (mouse)
Band	3|3 G2	Start	127,347,138 bp
Band	3|3 G2	End	127,411,672 bp
RNA expression pattern
Bgee	Human / Mouse (ortholog); Top expressed in: testicle; ventricular zone; ganglionic eminence; gonad; Achilles tendon; bone marrow cell; oocyte; corpus callosum; appendix; spleen / Top expressed in: hand; tail of embryo; genital tubercle; secondary oocyte; vas deferens; spermatocyte; epiblast; Gonadal ridge; ventricular zone; zygote; More reference expression data
BioGPS	n/a
Orthologs
Databases	NCBI: entry; OMA: entry
Species	Human	Mouse
Entrez	55345	71643
Ensembl	ENSG00000138658	ENSMUSG00000051278
UniProt	Q86YA3	Q0VGT4
RefSeq (mRNA)	NM_001099776; NM_018392; NM_138698; NM_001350397	NM_197997
RefSeq (protein)	NP_060862; NP_001337326	NP_932114
Location (UCSC)	Chr 4: 112.54 – 112.64 Mb	Chr 3: 127.35 – 127.41 Mb
PubMed search
- Wikidata
View/Edit Human	View/Edit Mouse

Protein ZGRF1 is a protein encoded in the human by the ZGRF1 gene also known as C4orf21, that has a weight of 236.6 kDa. The ZGRF1 gene product localizes to the cell nucleus and promotes DNA repair by stimulating homologous recombination. This gene shows relatively low expression in most human tissues, with increased expression in situations of chemical dependence. ZGRF1 is orthologous to nearly all eukaryotes. Functional domains of this protein link it to a series of helicases, most notably the AAA_12 and AAA_11 domains.

== Gene ==
The entire gene is 97,663 base pairs long and has an unprocessed mRNA that is 6,740 nucleotides in length. It consists of 28 exons that encode for a 2104 amino acid protein. 12 splice variants exist for C4orf21.

Human chromosomal position of c4orf21 gene on the long arm of chromosome 4

=== Locus ===
ZGRF1 is located on the fourth chromosome on the 4q25 position near the LARP7 gene. It is encoded for on the minus strand.

== Homology and evolution ==
=== Homologous domains ===
ZGRF1 contains a DUF2439 domain (domain of unknown function), zf-GRF domain, and AAA_11 and an AAA_12 domain (ATPases associated with diverse cellular activities). DUF domains are involved in telomere maintenance and meiotic segregation. AAA_11 and AAA_12 contain a P-loop motif which are involved in conjugative transfer proteins. Other helicase domains are also present in c4orf21 orthologs.

=== Paralogs ===
There are 9 moderately-related proteins in humans that are paralogous to the ATP-dependent helicase containing domains in the C-terminus of c4orf21 after the 1612th amino acid. A majority of these proteins are in the RNA helicase family. There are no known paralogs to the large N-terminal portion of the protein.

Sequence identity of helicase domain in paralogs
Paralogous Protein	Protein Name	Amino Acid Identity	Amino Acid Similarity
UPF1	regulator of nonsense transcripts 1	32%	51%
IGHMBP2	immunoglobulin helicase μ-binding protein 2	30%	47%
MOV10	Moloney Leukemia Virus 10	30%	47%
SETX	senataxin	29%	43%
ZNFX1	zinc finger, NFX1-type containing 1	28%	47%
DNA2	DNA replication ATP-dependent helicase/nuclease	26%	44%
PPARG	peroxisome proliferator-activated receptor gamma	26%	43%
HELZ	helicase with zinc finger domain	25%	42%
AQR	intron-binding protein Aquarius	24%	48%

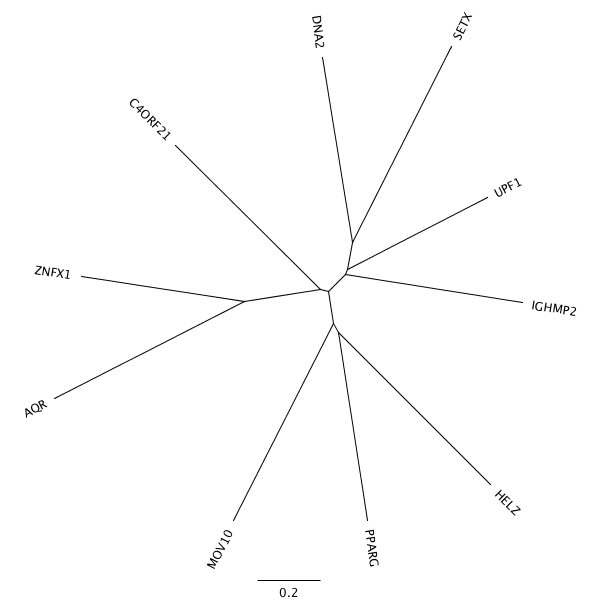
Unrooted phylogenetic tree of proteins that are paralogous to the helicase domain containing portion of c4orf21

=== Orthologs ===
Complete orthologs of the c4orf21 gene are found in mammalia. The helicase domain containing C-terminus portion of the gene is conserved across Eukarya.

== Protein ==
=== Primary sequence ===
ZGRF1 is 236.6 kDa.

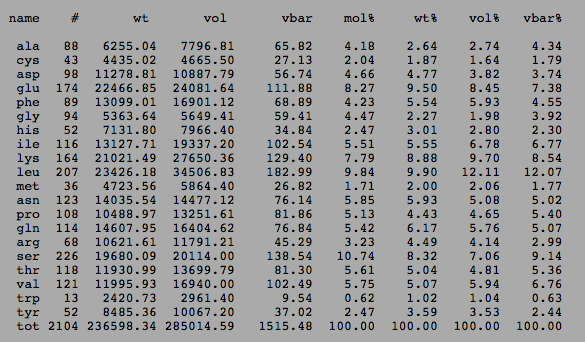
Amino Acid composition of c4orf21

=== Post-translational modifications ===
ZGRF1 has experimentally determined phosphorylation sites at the Y38, S137, S140, S325, and S864 positions.

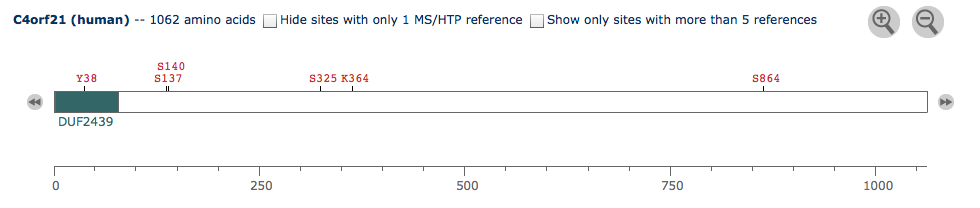
Experimentally determined post-translational modification sites in c4orf21

=== Secondary structure ===
A weak transmembrane domain is predicted in the TMHMM server with one loop in the C-terminus of the protein prior to the helicase core. This domain contains both ends outside of a membrane.

=== Tertiary domains and quaternary structure ===
ZGRF1 has related structures to Upf1, a paralog. These structures have the capability to bind zinc ions and mRNA.

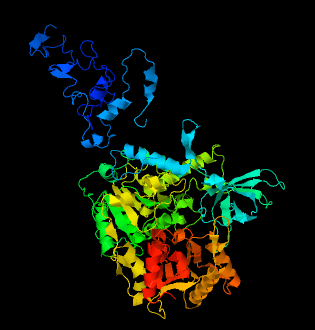
Structure of C4ORF21 based upon UPF1 model. Image colored in rainbow from N to C terminus. This structure is based upon the crystal structure of the complex between 2 human nonsense mediated decay factors, upf1 and upf2, orthorhombic form.

== Function and biochemistry ==
ZGRF1 is a 5'-to-3' DNA helicase that promotes genome stability by stimulating DNA repair by homologous recombination. Specifically, ZGRF1 facilitates repair of replication-blocking DNA lesions induced by agents such as mitomycin C and camptothecin. Mechanistically, ZGRF1 physically interacts with the RAD51 recombinase and stimulates strand exchange by RAD51-RAD54.

ZGRF1 shares homology in its DUF2439 domain with Saccharomyces cerevisiae Mte1 and Schizosaccharomyces pombe Dbl2, which play similar roles in recombinational DNA repair.

The human paralogs to the helicase core of the ZGRF1 gene are associated with translation, transcription, nonsense-mediated mRNA decay, RNA decay, miRNA processing, RISC assembly, and pre-mRNA splicing. These paralogs operate under a SPF1 RNA helicase motif.

Mov10, a paralog, and probable RNA helicase is required for RNA-mediated gene silencing by the RNA-induced silencing complex (RISC). It is also required for both miRNA-mediated translational repression and miRNA-mediated cleavage of complementary mRNAs by RISC, and for RNA-directed transcription and replication of the human hepatitis delta virus (HDV). Mov10 interacts with small capped HDV RNAs derived from genomic hairpin structures that mark the initiation sites of RNA-dependent HDV RNA transcription.

== Expression ==
Expression is relatively low for c4orf21 compared to other proteins. Expression of c4orf21 is slightly elevated compared to its average expression in tissue in the hematopoietic and lymphatic systems, and is above average in the brain also. Lower averages exist in liver, pharynx, and skin tissue.

=== Transcription factor interactions ===
The transcriptional start site for ZGRF1 aligns best with ATF, CREB, deltaCREB, E2F, and E2F-1 transcription factor binding sites.

== Interacting proteins ==
C4orf21 shows predicted protein interaction with its AQR, DNA2, IGHMBP2, LOC91431, and SETX paralogs.

== Clinical significance ==
Upon examination of variable GEO profiles, there were many related to Hepatitis and other disorders of the liver. The best correlative studies were those in relation to liver transplant failure. ZGRF1 showed significantly increased expression in those who were nicotine dependent versus a control group of non-smokers.

A paralog of ZGRF1 was found to inhibit HIV-1 Replication at multiple stages. Mov10 is involved in the biological processes of RNA-mediated gene silencing, transcription, transcription regulation and has hydrolase and helicase activity through ATP and RNA binding.
