= Helicase =

Class of enzymes that unpack genetic material

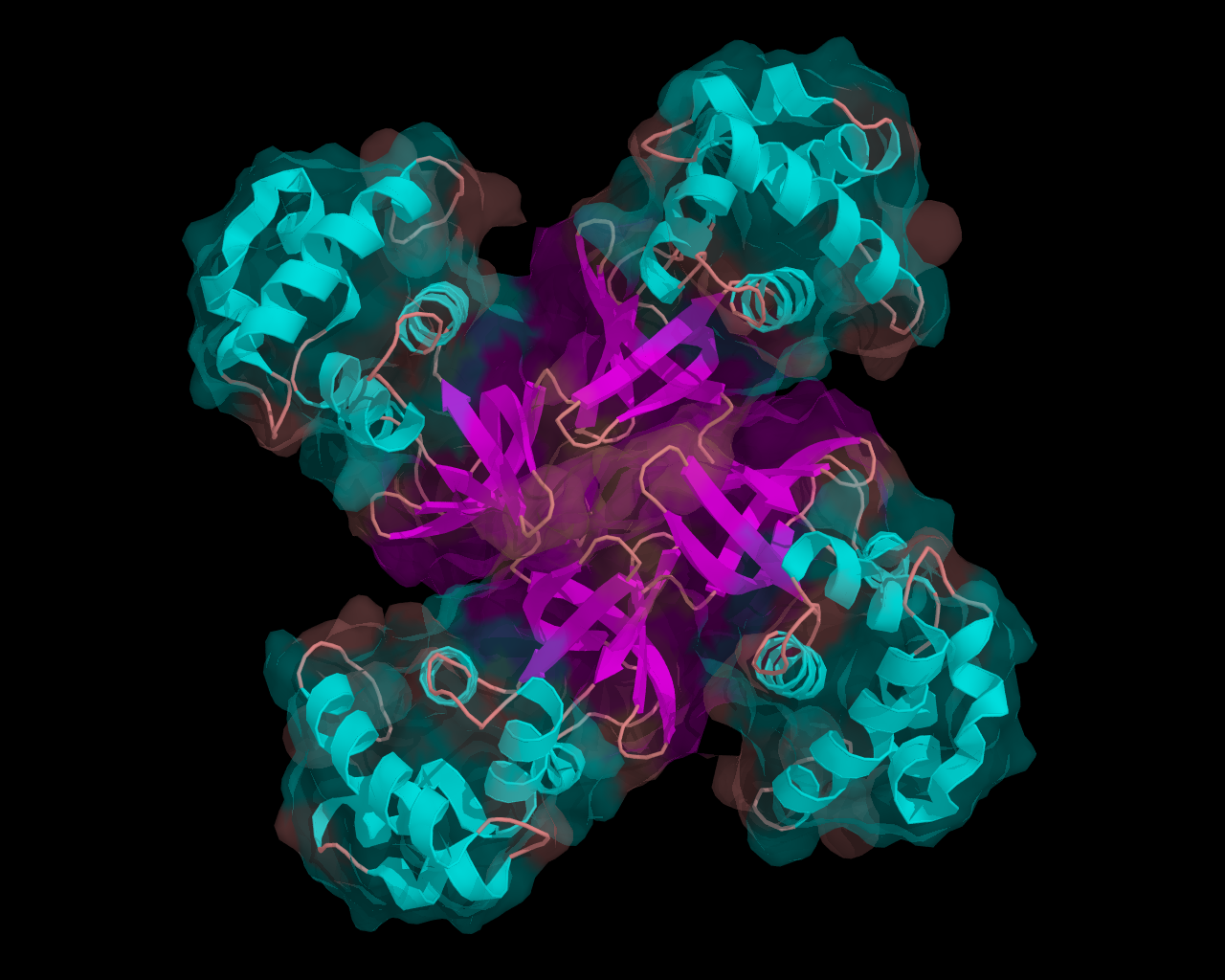
Structure of E. coli helicase RuvA (note that the helicase core in RuvAB complex is RuvB and not RuvA and that RuvA alone do not show helicase activity)

Helicases are a class of enzymes that are vital to all organisms. Their main function is to unpack an organism's genetic material. Helicases are motor proteins that move directionally along a nucleic double helix, separating the two hybridized nucleic acid strands (hence helic- + -ase), via the energy gained from ATP hydrolysis. There are many helicases, representing the great variety of processes in which strand separation must be catalyzed. Approximately 1% of eukaryotic genes code for helicases.

The human genome codes for 95 non-redundant helicases: 64 RNA helicases and 31 DNA helicases. Many cellular processes, such as DNA replication, transcription, translation, recombination, DNA repair and ribosome biogenesis involve the separation of nucleic acid strands that necessitates the use of helicases. Some specialized helicases are also involved in sensing viral nucleic acids during infection and fulfill an immunological function. Genetic mutations that affect helicases can have wide-reaching impacts for an organism, due to their significance in many biological processes.

== Function ==
Helicases are often used to separate strands of a DNA double helix or a self-annealed RNA molecule using the energy from ATP hydrolysis, a process characterized by the breaking of hydrogen bonds between annealed nucleotide bases. They also function to remove nucleic acid-associated proteins and catalyze homologous DNA recombination. Metabolic processes of RNA such as translation, transcription, ribosome biogenesis, RNA splicing, RNA transport, RNA editing, and RNA degradation are all facilitated by helicases. Helicases move incrementally along one nucleic acid strand of the duplex with a directionality and processivity specific to each particular enzyme.

Helicases adopt different structures and oligomerization states. Whereas DnaB-like helicases unwind DNA as ring-shaped hexamers, other enzymes have been shown to be active as monomers or dimers. Studies have shown that helicases may act passively, waiting for uncatalyzed unwinding to take place and then translocating between displaced strands, or can play an active role in catalyzing strand separation using the energy generated in ATP hydrolysis. In the latter case, the helicase acts comparably to an active motor, unwinding and translocating along its substrate as a direct result of its ATPase activity. Helicases may process much faster in vivo than in vitro due to the presence of accessory proteins that aid in the destabilization of the fork junction.

Helicase (blue triangle) separates the intertwined DNA strands so that daughter strands can form.

=== Activation barrier in helicase activity ===
Enzymatic helicase action, such as unwinding nucleic acids, is achieved through the lowering of the activation barrier ($B$) of each specific action. The activation barrier is a result of various factors, and can be defined by

$$B=N(\Delta G_\text{bp}-G_\text{int}-G_\text{f})$$

where

- $N$ = number of unwound base pairs (bps),
- $\Delta G_\text{bp}$ = free energy of base pair formation,
- $G_\text{int}$ = reduction of free energy due to helicase, and
- $G_\text{f}$ = reduction of free energy due to unzipping forces.

Factors that contribute to the height of the activation barrier include: specific nucleic acid sequence of the molecule involved, the number of base pairs involved, tension present on the replication fork, and destabilization forces.

=== Active and passive helicases ===
The size of the activation barrier to overcome by the helicase contributes to its classification as an active or passive helicase. In passive helicases, a significant activation barrier exists (defined as $B> k_\text{B}T$, where $k_\text{B}$ is the Boltzmann constant and $T$ is temperature of the system). Due to this significant activation barrier, its unwinding progression is affected largely by the sequence of nucleic acids within the molecule to unwind, and the presence of destabilization forces acting on the replication fork. Certain nucleic acid combinations will decrease unwinding rates (i.e. guanine and cytosine), while various destabilizing forces can increase the unwinding rate. In passive systems, the rate of unwinding ($V_{un}$) is less than the rate of translocation ($V_{trans}$) (translocation along the single-strand nucleic acid, ssNA), due to its reliance on the transient unraveling of the base pairs at the replication fork to determine its rate of unwinding.

In active helicases, $B< k_\text{B}T$, where the system lacks a significant barrier, as the helicase can destabilize the nucleic acids, unwinding the double-helix at a constant rate, regardless of the nucleic acid sequence. In active helicases, $V_\text{un}$ is closer to $V_\text{trans}$, due to the active helicase ability to directly destabilize the replication fork to promote unwinding.

Active helicases show similar behaviour when acting on both double-strand nucleic acids, dsNA, or ssNA, in regards to the rates of unwinding and rates of translocation, where in both systems $V_\text{un}$ and $V_\text{trans}$ are approximately equal.

These two categories of helicases may also be modeled as mechanisms. In such models, the passive helicases are conceptualized as Brownian ratchets, driven by thermal fluctuations and subsequent anisotropic gradients across the DNA lattice. The active helicases, in contrast, are conceptualized as stepping motors – also known as powerstroke motors – utilizing either a conformational "inch worm" or a hand-over-hand "walking" mechanism to progress. Depending upon the organism, such helix-traversing progress can occur at rotational speeds in the range of 5,000 to 10,000 R.P.M.

== History of DNA helicases ==
DNA helicases were discovered in E. coli in 1976. This helicase was described as a "DNA unwinding enzyme" that is "found to denature DNA duplexes in an ATP-dependent reaction, without detectably degrading". The first eukaryotic DNA helicase discovered was in 1978 in the lily plant. Since then, DNA helicases were discovered and isolated in other bacteria, viruses, yeast, flies, and higher eukaryotes. To date, at least 14 different helicases have been isolated from single celled organisms, 6 helicases from bacteriophages, 12 from viruses, 15 from yeast, 8 from plants, 11 from calf thymus, and approximately 25 helicases from human cells. Below is a history of helicase discovery:

- 1976 – Discovery and isolation of E. coli-based DNA helicase
- 1978 – Discovery of the first eukaryotic DNA helicases, isolated from the lily plant
- 1982 – "T4 gene 41 protein" is the first reported bacteriophage DNA helicase
- 1985 – First mammalian DNA helicases isolated from calf thymus
- 1986 – SV40 large tumor antigen reported as a viral helicase (1st reported viral protein that was determined to serve as a DNA helicase)
- 1986 – ATPaseIII, a yeast protein, determined to be a DNA helicase
- 1988 – Discovery of seven conserved amino acid domains determined to be helicase motifs
- 1989 – Designation of DNA helicase Superfamily I and Superfamily II
- 1989 – Identification of the DEAD box helicase family
- 1990 – Isolation of a human DNA helicase
- 1992 – Isolation of the first reported mitochondrial DNA helicase (from bovine brain)
- 1996 – Report of the discovery of the first purified chloroplast DNA helicase from the pea
- 2002 – Isolation and characterization of the first biochemically active malarial parasite DNA helicase – Plasmodium cynomolgi.

== Structural features ==
The common function of helicases accounts for the fact that they display a certain degree of amino acid sequence homology; they all possess sequence motifs located in the interior of their primary structure, involved in ATP binding, ATP hydrolysis and translocation along the nucleic acid substrate. The variable portion of the amino acid sequence is related to the specific features of each helicase.

The presence of these helicase motifs allows putative helicase activity to be attributed to a given protein, but does not necessarily confirm it as an active helicase. Conserved motifs do, however, support an evolutionary homology among enzymes. Based on these helicase motifs, a number of helicase superfamilies have been distinguished.

== Superfamilies ==
Helicases are classified in 6 groups (superfamilies) based on their shared sequence motifs. Helicases not forming a ring structure are in superfamilies 1 and 2, and ring-forming helicases form part of superfamilies 3 to 6. Helicases are also classified as α or β depending on if they work with single or double-strand DNA; α helicases work with single-strand DNA and β helicases work with double-strand DNA. They are also classified by translocation polarity. If translocation occurs 3'-5' the helicase is type A; if translocation occurs 5'-3' it is type B.

- Superfamily 1 (SF1): This superfamily can be further subdivided into SF1A and SF1B helicases. In this group helicases can have either 3'-5' (SF1A subfamily) or 5'-3'(SF1B subfamily) translocation polarity. The most known SF1A helicases are Rep and UvrD in gram-negative bacteria and PcrA helicase from gram-positive bacteria. The most known Helicases in the SF1B group are RecD and Dda helicases. They have a RecA-like-fold core.
- Superfamily 2 (SF2): This is the largest group of helicases that are involved in varied cellular processes. They are characterized by the presence of nine conserved motifs: Q, I, Ia, Ib, and II through VI. This group is mainly composed of DEAD-box RNA helicases. Some other helicases included in SF2 are the RecQ-like family and the Snf2-like enzymes. Most of the SF2 helicases are type A with a few exceptions such as the XPD family. They have a RecA-like-fold core.
- Superfamily 3 (SF3): Superfamily 3 consists of AAA+ helicases encoded mainly by small DNA viruses and some large nucleocytoplasmic DNA viruses. They have a 3'-5' translocation directionality, meaning that they are all type A helicases. The most known SF3 helicase is the papilloma virus E1 helicase.
- Superfamily 4 (SF4): All SF4 family helicases have a type B polarity (5'-3'). They have a RecA fold. The most studied SF4 helicase is gp4 from bacteriophage T7.
- Superfamily 5 (SF5): Rho proteins conform the SF5 group. They have a RecA fold.
- Superfamily 6 (SF6): They contain the core AAA+ that is not included in the SF3 classification. Some proteins in the SF6 group are: mini chromosome maintenance MCM, RuvB, RuvA, and RuvC.

All helicases are members of a P-loop, or Walker motif-containing family.

== Helicase disorders and diseases ==
=== ATRX helicase mutations ===
The ATRX gene encodes the ATP-dependent helicase, ATRX (also known as XH2 and XNP) of the SNF2 subgroup family, that is thought to be responsible for functions such as chromatin remodeling, gene regulation, and DNA methylation. These functions assist in prevention of apoptosis, resulting in cortical size regulation, as well as a contribution to the survival of hippocampal and cortical structures, affecting memory and learning. This helicase is located on the X chromosome (Xq13.1-q21.1), in the pericentromeric heterochromatin and binds to heterochromatin protein 1. Studies have shown that ATRX plays a role in rDNA methylation and is essential for embryonic development. Mutations have been found throughout the ATRX protein, with over 90% of them being located in the zinc finger and helicase domains. Mutations of ATRX can result in X-linked-alpha-thalassaemia-mental retardation (ATR-X syndrome).

Various types of mutations found in ATRX have been found to be associated with ATR-X, including most commonly single-base missense mutations, as well as nonsense, frameshift, and deletion mutations. Characteristics of ATR-X include: microcephaly, skeletal and facial abnormalities, intellectual disability, genital abnormalities, seizures, limited language use and ability, and alpha-thalassemia. The phenotype seen in ATR-X suggests that the mutation of ATRX gene causes the downregulation of gene expression, such as the alpha-globin genes. It is still unknown what causes the expression of the various characteristics of ATR-X in different patients.

=== XPD helicase point mutations ===
XPD (Xeroderma pigmentosum factor D, also known as protein ERCC2) is a 5'-3', Superfamily II, ATP-dependent helicase containing iron-sulphur cluster domains. Inherited point mutations in XPD helicase have been shown to be associated with accelerated aging disorders such as Cockayne syndrome (CS) and trichothiodystrophy (TTD). Cockayne syndrome and trichothiodystrophy are both developmental disorders involving sensitivity to UV light and premature aging, and Cockayne syndrome exhibits severe intellectual disability from the time of birth. The XPD helicase mutation has also been implicated in xeroderma pigmentosum (XP), a disorder characterized by sensitivity to UV light and resulting in a several 1000-fold increase in the development of skin cancer.

XPD is an essential component of the TFIIH complex, a transcription and repair factor in the cell. As part of this complex, it facilitates nucleotide excision repair by unwinding DNA. TFIIH assists in repairing damaged DNA such as sun damage. A mutation in the XPD helicase that helps form this complex and contributes to its function causes the sensitivity to sunlight seen in all three diseases, as well as the increased risk of cancer seen in XP and premature aging seen in trichothiodystrophy and Cockayne syndrome.

XPD helicase mutations leading to trichothiodystrophy are found throughout the protein in various locations involved in protein-protein interactions. This mutation results in an unstable protein due to its inability to form stabilizing interactions with other proteins at the points of mutations. This, in turn, destabilizes the entire TFIIH complex, which leads to defects with transcription and repair mechanisms of the cell.

It has been suggested that XPD helicase mutations leading to Cockayne syndrome could be the result of mutations within XPD, causing rigidity of the protein and subsequent inability to switch from repair functions to transcription functions due to a "locking" in repair mode. This could cause the helicase to cut DNA segments meant for transcription. Although current evidence points to a defect in the XPD helicase resulting in a loss of flexibility in the protein in cases of Cockayne syndrome, it is still unclear how this protein structure leads to the symptoms described in Cockayne syndrome.

In xeroderma pigmentosa, the XPD helicase mutation exists at the site of ATP or DNA binding. This results in a structurally functional helicase able to facilitate transcription, however it inhibits its function in unwinding DNA and DNA repair. The lack of a cell's ability to repair mutations, such as those caused by sun damage, is the cause of the high cancer rate in xeroderma pigmentosa patients.

=== RecQ family mutations ===
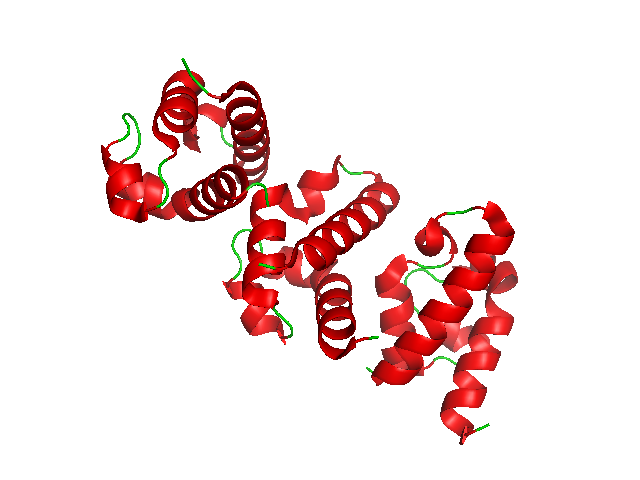
RecQ helicase

RecQ helicases (3'-5') belong to the Superfamily II group of helicases, which help to maintain stability of the genome and suppress inappropriate recombination. Deficiencies and/or mutations in RecQ family helicases display aberrant genetic recombination and/or DNA replication, which leads to chromosomal instability and an overall decreased ability to proliferate. Mutations in RecQ family helicases BLM, RECQL4, and WRN, which play a role in regulating homologous recombination, have been shown to result in the autosomal recessive diseases Bloom syndrome (BS), Rothmund–Thomson syndrome (RTS), and Werner syndrome (WS), respectively.

Bloom syndrome is characterized by a predisposition to cancer with early onset, with a mean age-of-onset of 24 years. Cells of Bloom syndrome patients show a high frequency of reciprocal exchange between sister chromatids (SCEs) and excessive chromosomal damage. There is evidence to suggest that BLM plays a role in rescuing disrupted DNA replication at replication forks.

Werner syndrome is a disorder of premature aging, with symptoms including early onset of atherosclerosis and osteoporosis and other age related diseases, a high occurrence of sarcoma, and death often occurring from myocardial infarction or cancer in the 4th to 6th decade of life. Cells of Werner syndrome patients exhibit a reduced reproductive lifespan with chromosomal breaks and translocations, as well as large deletions of chromosomal components, causing genomic instability.

Rothmund-Thomson syndrome, also known as poikiloderma congenitale, is characterized by premature aging, skin and skeletal abnormalities, rash, poikiloderma, juvenile cataracts, and a predisposition to cancers such as osteosarcomas. Chromosomal rearrangements causing genomic instability are found in the cells of Rothmund-Thomson syndrome patients. RecQ is a family of DNA helicase enzymes that are found in various organisms including bacteria, archaea, and eukaryotes (like humans). These enzymes play important roles in DNA metabolism during DNA replication, recombination, and repair. There are five known RecQ helicase proteins in humans: RecQ1, BLM, WRN, RecQ4, and RecQ5. Mutations in some of these genes are associated with genetic disorders. For instance, mutations in the BLM gene cause Bloom syndrome, which is characterized by increased cancer risk and other health issues. Mutations in the WRN gene lead to Werner syndrome, a condition characterized by premature aging and an increased risk of age-related diseases. RecQ helicases are crucial for maintaining genomic stability and integrity. They help prevent the accumulation of genetic abnormalities that can lead to diseases like cancer. Genome integrity depends on the RecQ DNA helicase family, which includes DNA repair, recombination, replication, and transcription processes. Genome instability and early aging are conditions that arise from mutations in human RecQ helicases. RecQ helicase Sgs1 is missing in yeast cells, making them useful models for comprehending human cell abnormalities and the RecQ helicase function. The RecQ helicase family member, RECQ1, is connected to a small number of uncommon genetic cancer disorders in individuals. It participates in transcription, the cell cycle, and DNA repair. According to recent research, missense mutations in the RECQ1 gene may play a role in the development of familial breast cancer. DNA helicases are frequently attracted to regions of DNA damage and are essential for cellular DNA replication, recombination, repair, and transcription. Chemical manipulation of their molecular processes can change the rate at which cancer cells divide, as well as, the efficiency of transactions and cellular homeostasis. Small-molecule-induced entrapment of DNA helicases, a type of DNA metabolic protein, may have deleterious consequences on rapidly proliferating cancer cells, which could be effective in cancer treatment.

During meiosis DNA double-strand breaks and other DNA damages in a chromatid are repaired by homologous recombination using either the sister chromatid or a homologous non-sister chromatid as template. This repair can result in a crossover (CO) or, more frequently, a non-crossover (NCO) recombinant. In the yeast Schizosaccharomyces pombe the FANCM-family DNA helicase FmI1 directs NCO recombination formation during meiosis. The RecQ-type helicase Rqh1 also directs NCO meiotic recombination. These helicases, through their ability to unwind D-loop intermediates, promote NCO recombination by the process of synthesis-dependent strand annealing.

In the plant Arabidopsis thaliana, FANCM helicase promotes NCO and antagonizes the formation of CO recombinants. Another helicase, RECQ4A/B, also independently reduces COs. It was suggested that COs are restricted because of the long term costs of CO recombination, that is, the breaking up of favourable genetic combinations of alleles built up by past natural selection.

== RNA helicases ==
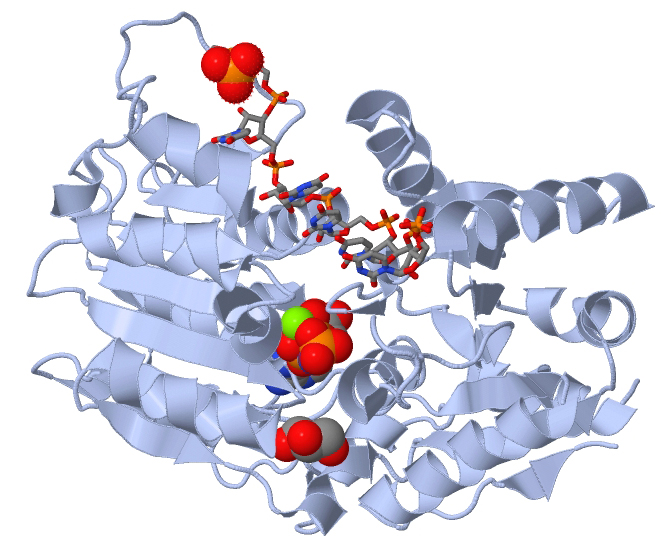
Human DEAD-box RNA helicase

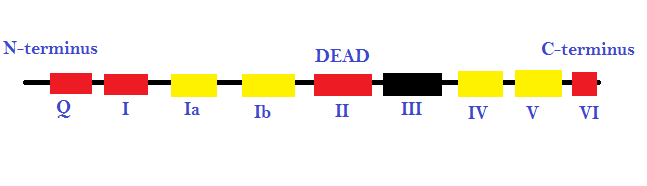
This image represents the different promoter sequences and accessory domains that aid in RNA unwinding (local strand separation). The regions in red are ATP binding domains and the regions in yellow are RNA interaction domains. Specific sequences termed DEAD box proteins are also present that help catalyze reactions in which ATP does not need to be directly hydrolyzed, as long as it binds to the domains on the strand.

RNA helicases are essential for most processes of RNA metabolism such as ribosome biogenesis, pre-mRNA splicing, and translation initiation. They also play an important role in sensing viral RNAs. RNA helicases are involved in the mediation of antiviral immune response because they can identify foreign RNAs in vertebrates. About 80% of all viruses are RNA viruses and they contain their own RNA helicases. Defective RNA helicases have been linked to cancers, infectious diseases and neuro-degenerative disorders. Some neurological disorders associated with defective RNA helicases are: amyotrophic lateral sclerosis, spinal muscular atrophy, spinocerebellar ataxia type-2, Alzheimer's disease, DHX30 syndrome, and lethal congenital contracture syndrome.

RNA helicases and DNA helicases can be found together in all the helicase superfamilies except for SF6. All the eukaryotic RNA helicases that have been identified up to date are non-ring forming and are part of SF1 and SF2. On the other hand, ring-forming RNA helicases have been found in bacteria and viruses. However, not all RNA helicases exhibit helicase activity as defined by enzymatic function, i.e., proteins of the Swi/Snf family. Although these proteins carry the typical helicase motifs, hydrolize ATP in a nucleic acid-dependent manner, and are built around a helicase core, in general, no unwinding activity is observed.

RNA helicases that do exhibit unwinding activity have been characterized by at least two different mechanisms: canonical duplex unwinding and local strand separation. Canonical duplex unwinding is the stepwise directional separation of a duplex strand, as described above, for DNA unwinding. However, local strand separation occurs by a process wherein the helicase enzyme is loaded at any place along the duplex. This is usually aided by a single-strand region of the RNA, and the loading of the enzyme is accompanied with ATP binding. Once the helicase and ATP are bound, local strand separation occurs, which requires binding of ATP but not the actual process of ATP hydrolysis. Presented with fewer base pairs the duplex then dissociates without further assistance from the enzyme. This mode of unwinding is used by the DEAD/DEAH box helicases.

In 2011, a group of researchers set up an RNA helicase database to comprehensively list RNA helicases with information such as sequence, structure, and biochemical and cellular functions.

== Diagnostic tools for helicase measurement ==
=== Measuring and monitoring helicase activity ===
Various methods are used to measure helicase activity in vitro. These methods range from assays that are qualitative (assays that usually entail results that do not involve values or measurements) to quantitative (assays with numerical results that can be utilized in statistical and numerical analysis). In 1982–1983, the first direct biochemical assay was developed for measuring helicase activity. This method was called a "strand displacement assay".

- Strand displacement assay involves the radiolabeling of DNA duplexes. Following helicase treatment, the single-strand DNA is visually detected as separate from the double-strand DNA by non-denaturing PAGE electrophoresis. Following detection of the single-strand DNA, the amount of radioactive tag that is on the single-strand DNA is quantified to give a numerical value for the amount of double-strand DNA unwinding.
  The strand displacement assay is acceptable for qualitative analysis, its inability to display results for more than a single time point, its time consumption, and its dependence on radioactive compounds for labeling warranted the need for development of diagnostics that can monitor helicase activity in real time.

Other methods were later developed that incorporated some, if not all of the following: high-throughput mechanics, the use of non-radioactive nucleotide labeling, faster reaction time/less time consumption, real-time monitoring of helicase activity (using kinetic measurement instead of endpoint/single point analysis). These methodologies include: "a rapid quench flow method, fluorescence-based assays, filtration assays, a scintillation proximity assay, a time resolved fluorescence resonance energy transfer assay, an assay based on flashplate technology, homogenous time-resolved fluorescence quenching assays, and electrochemiluminescence-based helicase assays". With the use of specialized mathematical equations, some of these assays can be utilized to determine how many base paired nucleotides a helicase can break per hydrolysis of 1 ATP molecule.

Commercially available diagnostic kits are also available. One such kit is the "Trupoint" diagnostic assay from PerkinElmer, Inc. This assay is a time-resolved fluorescence quenching assay that utilizes the PerkinElmer "SignalClimb" technology that is based on two labels that bind in close proximity to one another but on opposite DNA strands. One label is a fluorescent lanthanide chelate, which serves as the label that is monitored through an adequate 96/384 well plate reader. The other label is an organic quencher molecule. The basis of this assay is the "quenching" or repressing of the lanthanide chelate signal by the organic quencher molecule when the two are in close proximity – as they would be when the DNA duplex is in its native state. Upon helicase activity on the duplex, the quencher and lanthanide labels get separated as the DNA is unwound. This loss in proximity negates the quenchers ability to repress the lanthanide signal, causing a detectable increase in fluorescence that is representative of the amount of unwound DNA and can be used as a quantifiable measurement of helicase activity. The execution and use of single-molecule fluorescence imaging techniques, focusing on methods that include optical trapping in conjunction with epifluorescent imaging, and also surface immobilization in conjunction with total internal reflection fluorescence visualization. Combined with microchannel flow cells and microfluidic control, allow individual fluorescently labeled protein and DNA molecules to be imaged and tracked, affording measurement of DNA unwinding and translocation at single-molecule resolution.

=== Determining helicase polarity ===
Helicase polarity, which is also deemed "directionality", is defined as the direction (characterized as 5'→3' or 3'→5') of helicase movement on the DNA/RNA single-strand along which it is moving. This determination of polarity is vital in f.ex. determining whether the tested helicase attaches to the DNA leading strand, or the DNA lagging strand. To characterize this helicase feature, a partially duplex DNA is used as the substrate that has a central single-strand DNA region with different lengths of duplex regions of DNA (one short region that runs 5'→3' and one longer region that runs 3'→5') on both sides of this region. Once the helicase is added to that central single-strand region, the polarity is determined by characterization on the newly formed single-strand DNA.

== See also ==
- Chromodomain helicase DNA binding protein: CHD1, CHD1L, CHD2, CHD3, CHD4, CHD5, CHD6, CHD7, CHD8, CHD9
- DEAD box/DEAD/DEAH box helicase: DDX3X, DDX5, DDX6, DDX10, DDX11, DDX12, DDX58, DHX8, DHX9, DHX37, DHX40, DHX58, DHX30
- ASCC3, BLM, BRIP1, DNA2, FBXO18, FBXO30, HELB, HELLS, HELQ, HELZ, HFM1, HLTF, IFIH1, NAV2, PIF1, RECQL, RTEL1, SHPRH, SMARCA4, SMARCAL1, WRN, WRNIP1
- RNA helicase database
