= DNA2 =

DNA2 may refer to:

- DNA², a Japanese science fiction manga series
- DNA2L (DNA2-like) helicase, an enzyme that in humans is encoded by the DNA2 gene
