= Helicase, POLQ-like =

Protein-coding gene in the species Homo sapiens

HELQ

Identifiers
- Aliases: HELQ, HEL308, helicase, POLQ-like, helicase, POLQ like
- External IDs: OMIM: 606769; MGI: 2176740; GeneCards: HELQ
Enzyme activity
EC #	BRENDA	ExPASy	KEGG	MetaCyc
5.6.2.4	↗	↗	↗	↗

Gene location (Human)
Chr.	Chromosome 4 (human)
Band	4q21.23	Start	83,407,343 bp
Band	4q21.23	End	83,455,855 bp

Gene location (Mouse)
Chr.	Chromosome 5 (mouse)
Band	5|5 E4	Start	100,910,011 bp
Band	5|5 E4	End	100,946,464 bp
RNA expression pattern
Bgee	Human / Mouse (ortholog); Top expressed in: Achilles tendon; buccal mucosa cell; gonad; right adrenal cortex; left adrenal cortex; pancreatic epithelial cell; secondary oocyte; tibia; left ovary; testicle / Top expressed in: zygote; secondary oocyte; muscle of thigh; primary oocyte; neural layer of retina; spermatocyte; genital tubercle; tail of embryo; ventricular zone; epiblast; More reference expression data
BioGPS	n/a
Gene ontology
Molecular function	ATP binding; hydrolase activity; nucleotide binding; nucleic acid binding; helicase activity; DNA binding; protein binding
Cellular component	nucleolus; cytoplasm
Biological process	double-strand break repair via homologous recombination; DNA repair; cellular response to DNA damage stimulus; RNA secondary structure unwinding
Sources:Amigo / QuickGO
Orthologs
Databases	NCBI: entry; OMA: entry
Species	Human	Mouse
Entrez	113510	191578
Ensembl	ENSG00000163312	ENSMUSG00000035266
UniProt	Q8TDG4	Q2VPA6
RefSeq (mRNA)	NM_001297755; NM_001297756; NM_001297757; NM_001297758; NM_001297759 NM_133636	NM_001081107; NM_180984
RefSeq (protein)	NP_001284684; NP_001284685; NP_001284686; NP_001284687; NP_001284688 NP_598375	NP_001074576
Location (UCSC)	Chr 4: 83.41 – 83.46 Mb	Chr 5: 100.91 – 100.95 Mb
PubMed search
- Wikidata
View/Edit Human	View/Edit Mouse

Helicase, POLQ-like, also known as Helicase Q (HELQ), HEL308 and Holliday junction migration protein, encoded by the gene HELQ1, is a DNA helicase found in humans, archea and many other organisms.

HelQ is a replication-linked repair helicase that preserves DNA integrity through helping in the repair of DNA that has become damaged.

== Gene ==
The gene encoding this enzyme, HELQ1, is located on chromosome 4q21.23 in humans. It is associated with the polymerase pathway.

== Nomenclature ==
When first reported, Helicase Q was called "Holliday junction migration protein."

HelQ was originally identified and purified by Marini and Wood when they were looking for human homologues of Mus308, a protein involved in inter-strand crosslink repair. PolQ, also known as Polymerase θ, encodes a polymerase domain homologous to Mus308. HelQ contains the homologous helicase domain.

== Classification ==
Hel308 is part of DNA helicase Superfamily II. Superfamily II helicases are the largest and most diverse group and comprise helicases that contribute to a vast selection of roles including transcription, DNA repair, chromatin rearrangement and RNA metabolism. Human HelQ has been isolated and characterised as a ssDNA-dependent ATPase capable of translocating DNA with 3'-5' polarity. The HelQ apoenzyme is activated through ATP hydrolysis and ssDNA and forms active dimers with translocase and helicase activity.

Hel308 is found throughout archea and in some eukaryotes, including humans. It contains twenty exons.

== Structure and function ==
Helicase Q's principal role is in the DNA repair. HelQ is very highly conserved and is thought to contribute to a variety of DNA processes, such as DNA repair, unwinding and strand annealing. It is especially associated with DNA repair at locations where ssDNA has accumulated as a result of blocked replicative helicase or polymerase complexes.

A known function of HelQ is its participation in DNA repair at replication forks via interactions with homologous recombination proteins, such as replication protein A and Rad51 and Rad51 paralogues BCDX2. There are many pathways which both recognise and repair DNA damage and/or lesions, and HelQ is implicated in nucleotide excision repair, interstrand cross-links and double-strand break repair to carry out its role. HelQ is thought to be essential for the function of synthesis-dependent strand annealing (a type of homologous recombination), micro-homology mediated end joining of G4-induced double-strand breaks and single-strand annealing in genome stability and tumour avoidance.

Hel308 is a large protein, 1101 amino acids in length, with five separate domains. The third and fourth domains form a large central pore that holds single-stranded DNA. Its fifth domain acts as a brake by securing the single-strand DNA protruding through this pore.

Residues 1-241 of the N-terminal end of the protein, termed N-HelQ, is only present in mammalian HelQ, but is not found in archaea and prokaryotes. A PWI-like fold is present in N-HelQ and shares homology with the PWI-fold in yeast Ski2 like helicase Brr2. N-HelQ lacks amino acid homology to other proteins and is thought to be intrinsically disordered.

== Expression ==
HelQ is found in many tissues, including the testes, ovaries, skeletal muscle, and heart, where its expression levels vary. How HelQ acts is reliant on the tissue it is located in. High levels of HelQ are tumour suppressing and correspond to a better patient prognosis in osteosarcoma and non-small cell lung cancer, but high levels of HelQ in ovarian cancer is associated with poor patient prognosis. Overexpression of HelQ promotes resistance to treatments for ovarian cancers which are based on DNA crosslinking.

== Clinical significance ==
HelQ's mutations and gene deletions cause a change in the efficacy of DNA replication, as well as causing hypersensitivity of cells to DNA cross-linking agents, which result in blockage of DNA replication. HelQ is also thought to have an additional role in germ line stability, as its deficiency affects fertility.

Mutations in HEL308 are associated with cancer of the pharynx and mouth.

In the clinic, HelQ defects have been associated with breast and ovarian cancers, oesophageal squamous carcinoma and reproductive issues, although the precise, mechanistic links are currently unknown. Number variations in helq are associated with ovarian cancers, with loss of HelQ in cells leading to a predisposition to cancer and infertility.

The wide range of roles HelQ plays in tumourigenesis, resulting from its involvement in tumour proliferation, metastasis, platinum resistance, cell-cycle regulation and DNA damage response, emphasise its potential as a drug target for novel cancer treatments.

== See also ==
- Helicase
- DNA repair
- DNA replication
