= ZFAS1 =

Non-coding RNA found in humans

Identifiers
- Aliases: ZFAS1, C20orf199, HSUP1, HSUP2, NCRNA00275, ZNFX1-AS1, ZNFX1 antisense RNA 1
- External IDs: GeneCards: ZFAS1

Gene location (Human)
Chr.	Chromosome 20 (human)
Band	20q13.13	Start	49,278,178 bp
Band	20q13.13	End	49,299,600 bp
RNA expression pattern
Bgee	Human / Mouse (ortholog); Top expressed in: skin of arm; cartilage tissue; ganglionic eminence; mucosa of ileum; left ovary; tibialis anterior muscle; Achilles tendon; right ovary; skin of abdomen; monocyte / n/a; More reference expression data
BioGPS	n/a
Orthologs
Databases	NCBI: entry; OMA: entry
Species	Human	Mouse
Entrez	441951	n/a
Ensembl	ENSG00000177410	n/a
UniProt	n a	n/a
RefSeq (mRNA)	n/a	n/a
RefSeq (protein)	n/a	n/a
Location (UCSC)	Chr 20: 49.28 – 49.3 Mb	n/a
PubMed search		n/a
- Wikidata
View/Edit Human

ZNFX1 antisense RNA 1 is a long non-coding RNA that in humans is encoded by the gene ZFAS1 (previously ZNFX1-A1). It is expressed in the lung and mammary gland in mice. Its expression is down-regulated in mammary tumours, it may function as a tumour suppressor gene. The ZNFX1-AS1 gene hosts three snoRNA genes (SNORD12, SNORD12B and SNORD12C)).

== See also ==
- Long noncoding RNA
