= Small nucleolar RNA SNORA73 =

Small nucleolar RNA SNORA73 family
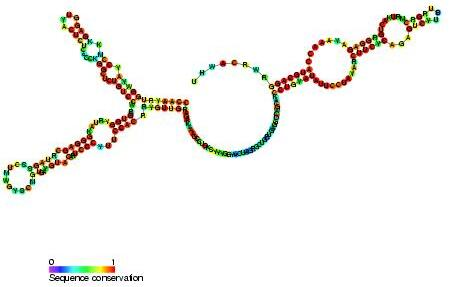
- Predicted secondary structure and sequence conservation of SNORA73

Identifiers
- Symbol: SNORA73
- Alt. Symbols: U17
- Rfam: RF00045

Other data
- RNA type: Gene; snRNA; snoRNA; HACA-box
- Domain: Eukaryota
- GO: GO:0006396 GO:0005730
- SO: SO:0000594
- PDB structures: PDBe

In molecular biology, the small nucleolar RNA SNORA73 (also called U17/E1 RNA) belongs to the H/ACA class of small nucleolar RNAs (snoRNAs). SNORA73 has functions involved in mediating the formation of 18S rRNA (an essential component of the ribosome), regulating chromatin function, and facilitating secretion of proteins by directing specific mRNAs to the signal recognition particle (SRP). SNORA73 has been dubbed a ternary-glue snoRNA (TAG-snoRNA) because of its ability to promote association of mRNAs encoding secreted proteins with the SRP.

SNORA73 is one of the most abundant snoRNAs in human cells and its length in vertebrates ranges from 200-230 nucleotides, making it longer that most snoRNAs. There are two near copies of SNORA73 in the human genome, SNORA73A and SNORA73B, both found in the introns of snoRNA host gene 3 (SNHG3).

== Formation of 18S rRNA ==
SNORA73 (U17) is essential for the cleavage of pre-rRNA within the 5' external transcribed spacer (ETS). This cleavage leads to the formation of 18S rRNA. Regions of the U17 RNA are complementary to rRNA and act as guides for RNA/RNA interactions, although these regions do not seem to be well conserved between organisms.

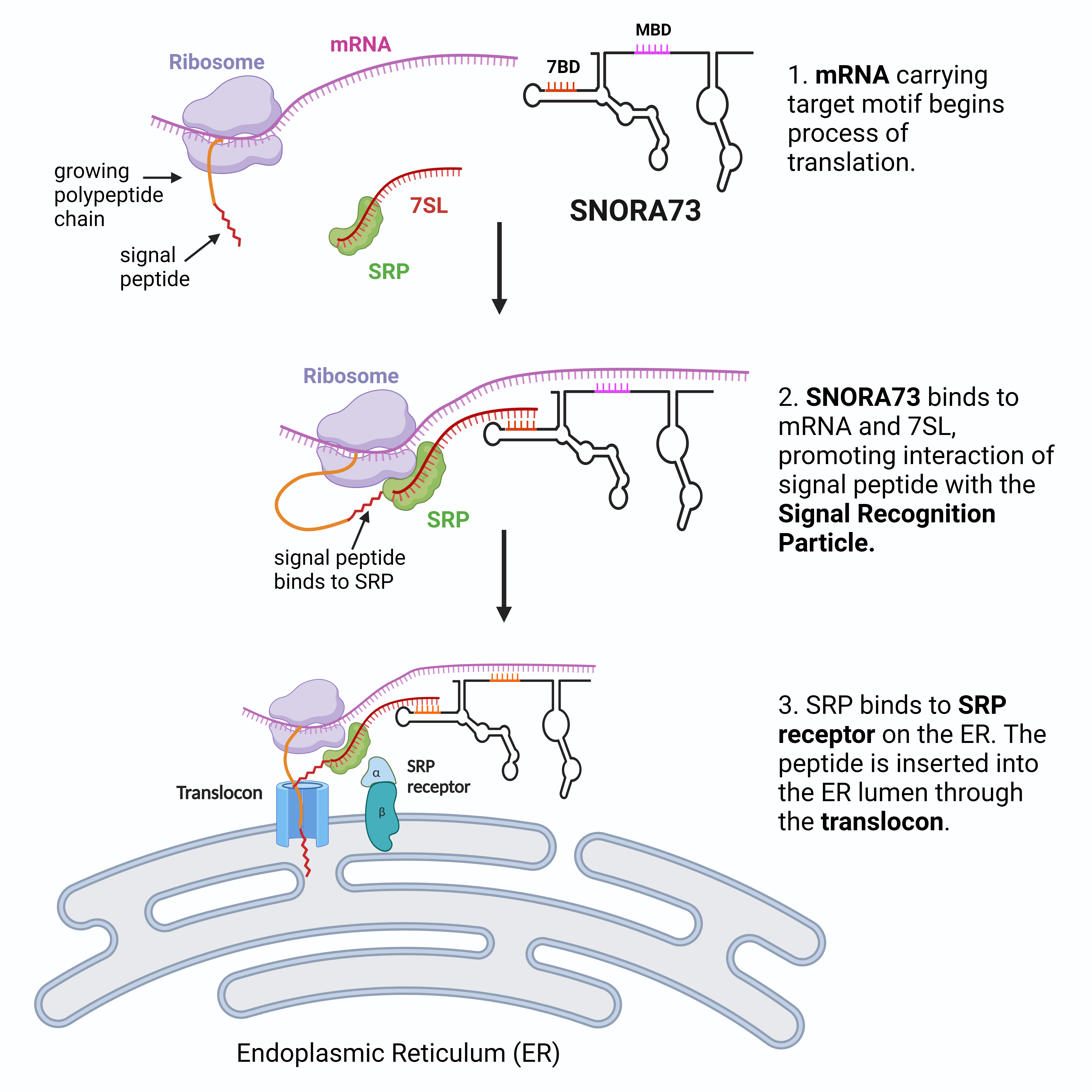
SNORA73 Facilitates Protein Secretion via mRNA-SNORA73-7SL RNA interactions. MBD = mRNA Binding Domain, 7BD = 7SL Binding Domain.

== Involvement in protein secretion ==
SNORA73 promotes protein secretion by directing mRNA containing the sequence GAGGCCCAGC to interact with the signal recognition particle (SRP) Complex.

SNORA73 has two conserved RNA binding domains: 1) an mRNA binding domain (MBD) and 2) a 7SL binding domain (7BD) that recognizes a 14-bp region of 7SL, the RNA component of the ribonucleoprotein SRP complex. Binding of both domains creates mRNA-SNORA73-7SL RNA interactions, which causes SRP to interact with and bind the ribosome (aided in part by signal peptides present on the growing polypeptide chain). SRP then binds to SRP receptor on the surface of the Endoplasmic Reticulum (ER), allowing the peptide to pass through the translocon into the ER lumen, where proteins are processed for secretion or trafficking to the cell membrane. SNORA73 thus acts as a molecular glue that facilitates interactions between mRNA and the SRP, improving the rate of secretion of proteins encoded by the target mRNA.

== Other functions ==
There is evidence that SNORA73 functions as a regulator of chromatin function. SNORA73 is chromatin-associated RNA (caRNA) and stably linked to chromatin. Notably, SNORA73 can bind to PARP1, leading to the activation of its ADPRylation (PAR) function. SNORA73 Interacts with the PARP1 DNA-Binding Domain. In addition, the snoRNA-activated PARP1 ADPRylates DDX21 in cells to promote cell proliferation.

== See also ==
- Small nucleolar SNORD12/SNORD106
