= PIF1 5'-to-3' DNA helicase =

Protein-coding gene in the species Homo sapiens

PIF1
Available structures
PDB	Ortholog search: PDBe RCSB
PDB	List of PDB id codes 5FHH

Identifiers
- Aliases: PIF1, C15orf20, PIF, PIF1 5'-to-3' DNA helicase
- External IDs: OMIM: 610953; MGI: 2143057; HomoloGene: 99775; GeneCards: PIF1; OMA:PIF1 - orthologs

Gene location (Human)
Chr.	Chromosome 15 (human)
Band	15q22.31	Start	64,815,632 bp
Band	15q22.31	End	64,825,668 bp

Gene location (Mouse)
Chr.	Chromosome 9 (mouse)
Band	9|9 C	Start	65,587,160 bp
Band	9|9 C	End	65,595,967 bp
RNA expression pattern
Bgee	Human / Mouse (ortholog); Top expressed in: ventricular zone; gonad; ganglionic eminence; stromal cell of endometrium; mucosa of transverse colon; appendix; granulocyte; bone marrow cell; spleen; lymph node / Top expressed in: otic vesicle; hand; Paneth cell; ventricular zone; primitive streak; tail of embryo; genital tubercle; endothelial cell of lymphatic vessel; hair follicle; thymus; More reference expression data
BioGPS	n/a
Gene ontology
Molecular function	nucleotide binding; DNA binding; telomeric DNA binding; helicase activity; DNA helicase activity; single-stranded DNA helicase activity; 5'-3' DNA/RNA helicase activity; hydrolase activity; ATP binding; magnesium ion binding; telomerase inhibitor activity; 5'-3' DNA helicase activity; G-quadruplex DNA binding
Cellular component	replication fork; mitochondrion; nucleus
Biological process	DNA recombination; regulation of telomere maintenance; negative regulation of telomerase activity; G-quadruplex DNA unwinding; cellular response to DNA damage stimulus; telomere maintenance; DNA repair; DNA duplex unwinding; mitochondrial genome maintenance; DNA replication; negative regulation of telomere maintenance via telomerase
Sources:Amigo / QuickGO
Orthologs
Species	Human	Mouse
Entrez	80119	208084
Ensembl	ENSG00000140451	ENSMUSG00000041064
UniProt	Q9H611	Q80SX8
RefSeq (mRNA)	NM_001286496; NM_001286497; NM_001286499; NM_025049	NM_172453; NM_001357526; NM_001357527
RefSeq (protein)	NP_001273425; NP_001273426; NP_001273428; NP_079325	NP_766041; NP_001344455; NP_001344456
Location (UCSC)	Chr 15: 64.82 – 64.83 Mb	Chr 9: 65.59 – 65.6 Mb
PubMed search
- Wikidata
View/Edit Human	View/Edit Mouse

PIF1 5'-to-3' DNA helicase is a protein that in humans is encoded by the PIF1 gene.

== Function ==
This gene encodes a DNA-dependent adenosine triphosphate (ATP)-metabolizing enzyme that functions as a 5' to 3' DNA helicase. The encoded protein can resolve G-quadruplex structures and RNA-DNA hybrids at the ends of chromosomes. It also prevents telomere elongation by inhibiting the actions of telomerase. Alternative splicing and the use of alternative start codons results in multiple isoforms that are differentially localized to either the mitochondria or the nucleus. [provided by RefSeq, Nov 2013].
