= HELLS =

Protein-coding gene in the species Homo sapiens

Identifiers
- Aliases: HELLS, LSH, PASG, SMARCA6, Nbla10143, ICF4, helicase, lymphoid-specific, helicase, lymphoid specific
- External IDs: OMIM: 603946; MGI: 106209; GeneCards: HELLS

Gene location (Human)
Chr.	Chromosome 10 (human)
Band	10q23.33	Start	94,501,434 bp
Band	10q23.33	End	94,613,905 bp

Gene location (Mouse)
Chr.	Chromosome 19 (mouse)
Band	19|19 C3	Start	38,919,359 bp
Band	19|19 C3	End	38,959,495 bp
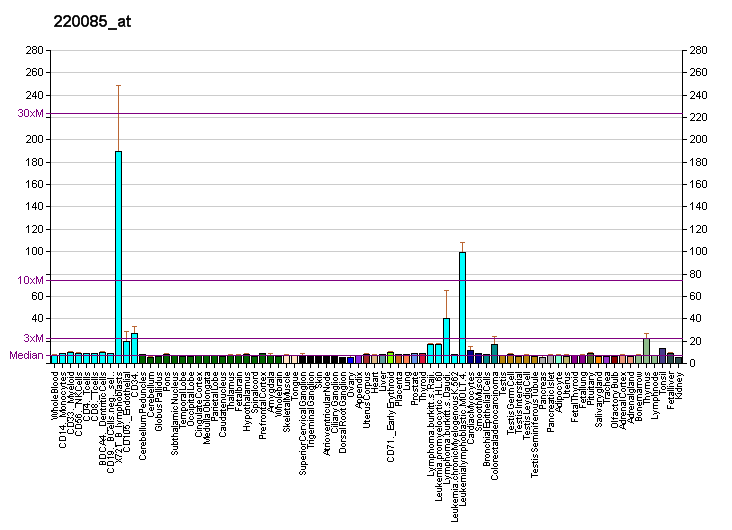
RNA expression pattern
Bgee	Human / Mouse (ortholog); Top expressed in: thymus; gonad; testicle; ventricular zone; oocyte; secondary oocyte; ganglionic eminence; epithelium of colon; right testis; mucosa of transverse colon / Top expressed in: epiblast; tail of embryo; abdominal wall; Gonadal ridge; primitive streak; migratory enteric neural crest cell; genital tubercle; mandibular prominence; secondary oocyte; somite; More reference expression data
BioGPS	More reference expression data
Gene ontology
Molecular function	nucleotide binding; protein binding; ATP binding; helicase activity; hydrolase activity
Cellular component	pericentric heterochromatin; chromosome, centromeric region; nucleus
Biological process	lymphocyte proliferation; cell cycle; pericentric heterochromatin assembly; maintenance of DNA methylation; DNA methylation-dependent heterochromatin assembly; regulation of transcription, DNA-templated; transcription, DNA-templated; cell division; multicellular organism development; metabolism
Sources:Amigo / QuickGO
Orthologs
Databases	NCBI: entry; OMA: entry
Species	Human	Mouse
Entrez	3070	15201
Ensembl	ENSG00000119969	ENSMUSG00000025001
UniProt	Q9NRZ9; Q76H82	Q60848
RefSeq (mRNA)	NM_018063; NM_001289067; NM_001289068; NM_001289069; NM_001289070 NM_001289071; NM_001289072; NM_001289073; NM_001289074; NM_001289075	NM_008234
RefSeq (protein)	NP_001275996; NP_001275997; NP_001275998; NP_001275999; NP_001276000 NP_001276001; NP_001276002; NP_001276003; NP_001276004; NP_060533; NP_001276000.1; NP_001276000.1	NP_032260
Location (UCSC)	Chr 10: 94.5 – 94.61 Mb	Chr 19: 38.92 – 38.96 Mb
PubMed search
- Wikidata
View/Edit Human	View/Edit Mouse

Lymphoid-specific helicase (Lsh) is a member of the SNF2 helicase family of chromatin remodeling proteins that in humans is encoded by the HELLS gene.

The HELLS gene has proved to play critical roles in DNA methylation, chromatin packaging, control of Hox genes, stem cell proliferation, and developing lymphoid tissue.

In a developing embryo, epigenetic programming is controlled through the mechanisms of DNA methylation and chromatin organization. These processes are the master regulators that determine which genes are turned on or off throughout development. Lsh, a protein encoded by the HELLS gene is a major regulator of methylation patterns and thus crucial to normal fetal development.

Mutations and knockouts of the HELLS gene severely disrupts the process of fetal programming. In mice, knockout of HELLS gene resulted in death of embryos at birth and caused embryonic growth retardation. In humans, hypomethylation caused by a mutation in the HELLS gene is linked to Immunodeficiency-centromeric instability-facial anomalies syndrome 4 (ICF4). This is a rare disease that causes immunodeficiency, facial anomalies, growth retardation, failure to thrive, and psychomotor retardation. The adverse effects due to the absence and mutation of the HELLS gene is a result of the extensive loss of genomic wide methylation and the abnormal expression of repeat sequences. The disruption in methylation patterns can cause the silencing of genes or the over-expression of genes, leading to abnormal and in some cases fatal developmental consequences.

This gene encodes a lymphoid-specific helicase. Other helicases function in processes involving DNA strand separation, including replication, repair, recombination, and transcription. This protein is thought to be involved with cellular proliferation and may play a role in leukemogenesis. Alternatively spliced transcript variants have been described, but their biological validity has not been determined.
