= Scintillation proximity assay =

Scintillation proximity assay (SPA) is an assay development and biochemical screening that permits the rapid and sensitive measurement of a broad range of biological processes in a homogeneous system. The type of beads that are involved in the SPA are microscopic in size and within the beads itself, there is a scintillant which emits light when it is stimulated. Stimulation occurs when radio-labelled molecules interact and bind to the surface of the bead. This interaction will trigger the bead to emit light, which can be detected using a photometer.

== Overview ==
The SPA technique is dependent on the energy conversion of radioactive decay, which releases light photons which can be detected via the use of some devices such as the photomultiplier tubes of scintillation counters or CCD imagers. This is a very popular technique in practices that require detecting and quantifying radioactivity.

The process of converting radioactivity to light requires a liquid medium of scintillation combination consisting soluble organic scintillators and organic solvents. During the process of radioactive decay, a beta particle will be released. While this particle travels in the medium, the energy it possesses is dissipated as it collides with the surrounding molecules in the solvent, exciting them while doing so. The excited molecules will transfer the energy they now possess to the scintillator molecules, where the energy will be emitted as light.

== Detail ==
In more detail, when the radio-labelled molecule is attached or is in proximity to bead, light emission is stimulated. However, if the bead does not become bound to the radio-labelled molecule, the bead will not be stimulated to emit light. This is because the beta particles (high-velocity electrons) released from the unbound molecule are lost to collisions with water molecules if they are too far from the scintillant-containing beads, and so the SPA bead which is not then stimulated to produce a signal.

The decay of radioactive atoms releases subatomic particles and/or gamma rays. Tritium releases electrons as one of the subatomic particles. The energy of these particles influences the distance traveled by the particles itself through a medium such as water, because there is an inverse correlation between particle kinetic energy and strength of interaction with matter. The SPA method depends on the short pathlength of tritium-released beta particles.

For instance, the decay of a Tritium atom releases a beta particle, which is well-suited to SPA due to a very short (1.5 μm) path length through water. So, when the β-particle is within 1.5 μm of the scintillant bead, there is sufficient energy to stimulate the bead to emit light. If the distance between them is greater than 1.5 μm, then the β-particle has insufficient energy to reach and stimulate the bead.

The beads in SPA are formed from the incorporation of scintillant into small beads known as fluomicrospheres. These are specially designed to bind with specific molecules. When the bead is close to the radioactive molecule, light is stimulated.

The photonmultiplier tube (PMT) can be used to detect the emitted photons. This device converts the emitted photon energy into electrical energy by a photocathode via a series of other electrodes. Another device is known as CCD Imager, which is composed of a set of cooled digital cameras with sensitive charge coupled device detectors and with some refined telecentric lenses to convert the captured photon energy into high quality images.

There is also an assortment of bead coatings available that allows this method to be applied to a broad range of applications, such as enzyme assays and radio-immuno assays.

== Advantages over previous methods ==
In comparison to the previous over-coated plate-based methods, SPA has a number of advantages that makes it more popular:

- Assay flexibility - the concentration of the components in the assay can be adjusted to suit the user due to the higher surface area design of the SPA beads, hence providing the user flexibility in designing assay.
- Radioactive label reduction - the SPA beads allows a potential reduction in the quantity of radioactive labeling required due to its higher binding capacity, which gives a higher signal. This method also allows the user to optimize the sensitivity of the assay by altering the quantity of SPA beads.
- Convenient - the key component of the SPA assay, the beads, do not depend on a particular plate type or supplier, hence its wide availability.
- Bead assortment - there is a diversity of bead types to choose from to suit the need of the user and application.
- No separation step - allows binding measurement without separation step associated with earlier methods, which reduces errors and allows higher throughput.
