= DDX10 =

Protein-coding gene in the species Homo sapiens

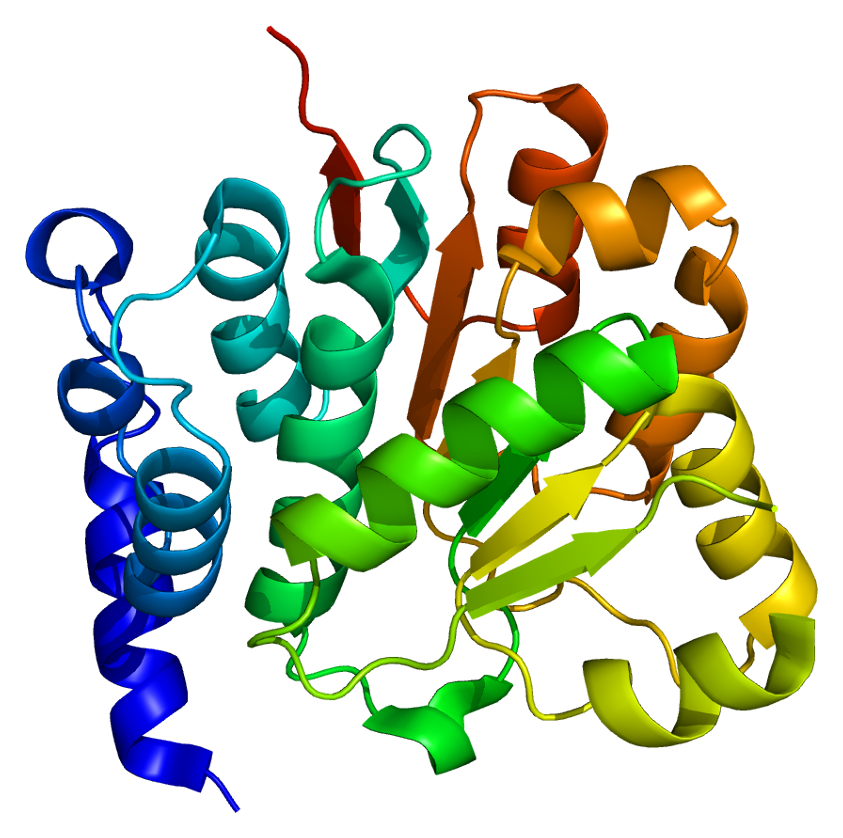

Identifiers
- Aliases: DDX10, HRH-J8, DEAD-box helicase 10, Dbp4
- External IDs: OMIM: 601235; MGI: 1924841; GeneCards: DDX10
Available structures
PDB	Ortholog search: PDBe RCSB
PDB	List of PDB id codes 2PL3
Enzyme activity
EC #	BRENDA	ExPASy	KEGG	MetaCyc
3.6.4.13	↗	↗	↗	↗

Gene location (Human)
Chr.	Chromosome 11 (human)
Band	11q22.3	Start	108,665,058 bp
Band	11q22.3	End	108,940,999 bp

Gene location (Mouse)
Chr.	Chromosome 9 (mouse)
Band	9|9 A5.3	Start	53,009,935 bp
Band	9|9 A5.3	End	53,159,353 bp
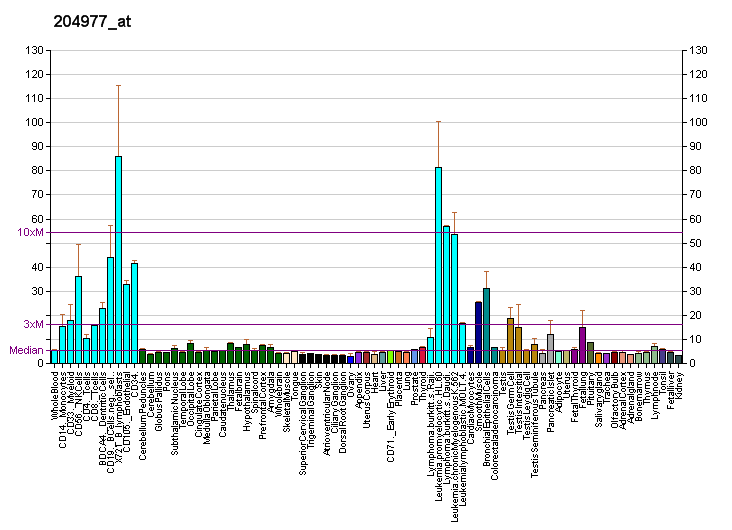
RNA expression pattern
Bgee	Human / Mouse (ortholog); Top expressed in: sural nerve; testicle; Achilles tendon; right testis; left testis; gonad; ganglionic eminence; ventricular zone; kidney tubule; left uterine tube / Top expressed in: tail of embryo; otic placode; saccule; genital tubercle; Gonadal ridge; epiblast; primitive streak; otic vesicle; hair follicle; maxillary prominence; More reference expression data
BioGPS	More reference expression data
Gene ontology
Molecular function	RNA helicase activity; nucleotide binding; hydrolase activity; ATP binding; helicase activity; nucleic acid binding; RNA binding
Cellular component	nucleolus; cytoplasm
Biological process	RNA secondary structure unwinding; anterior head development
Sources:Amigo / QuickGO
Orthologs
Databases	NCBI: entry; OMA: entry
Species	Human	Mouse
Entrez	1662	77591
Ensembl	ENSG00000178105	ENSMUSG00000053289
UniProt	Q13206	Q80Y44
RefSeq (mRNA)	NM_004398	NM_029936
RefSeq (protein)	NP_004389	NP_084212
Location (UCSC)	Chr 11: 108.67 – 108.94 Mb	Chr 9: 53.01 – 53.16 Mb
PubMed search
- Wikidata
View/Edit Human	View/Edit Mouse

Probable ATP-dependent RNA helicase DDX10 is an enzyme that in humans is encoded by the DDX10 gene.

DEAD box proteins, characterized by the conserved motif Asp-Glu-Ala-Asp (DEAD), are putative RNA helicases. They are implicated in a number of cellular processes involving alteration of RNA secondary structure such as translation initiation, nuclear and mitochondrial splicing, and ribosome and spliceosome assembly. Based on their distribution patterns, some members of this family are believed to be involved in embryogenesis, spermatogenesis, and cellular growth and division. This gene encodes a DEAD box protein, and it may be involved in ribosome assembly. Fusion of this gene and the nucleoporin gene, NUP98, by inversion 11 (p15q22) chromosome translocation is found in the patients with de novo or therapy-related myeloid malignancies.
