= CHD9 =

Protein-coding gene in humans

Identifiers
- Aliases: CHD9, AD013, CReMM, KISH2, PRIC320, CHD-9, chromodomain helicase DNA binding protein 9
- External IDs: OMIM: 616936; MGI: 1924001; GeneCards: CHD9

Gene location (Human)
Chr.	Chromosome 16 (human)
Band	16q12.2	Start	53,054,991 bp
Band	16q12.2	End	53,329,150 bp

Gene location (Mouse)
Chr.	Chromosome 8 (mouse)
Band	8|8 C4	Start	91,554,980 bp
Band	8|8 C4	End	91,781,144 bp
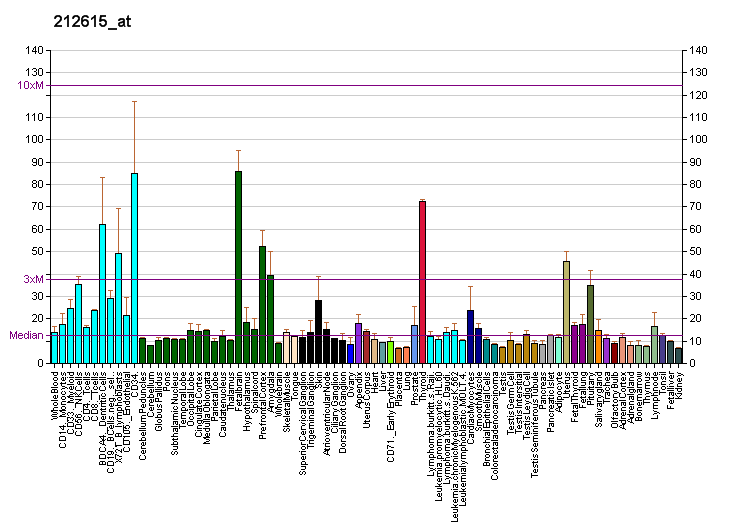

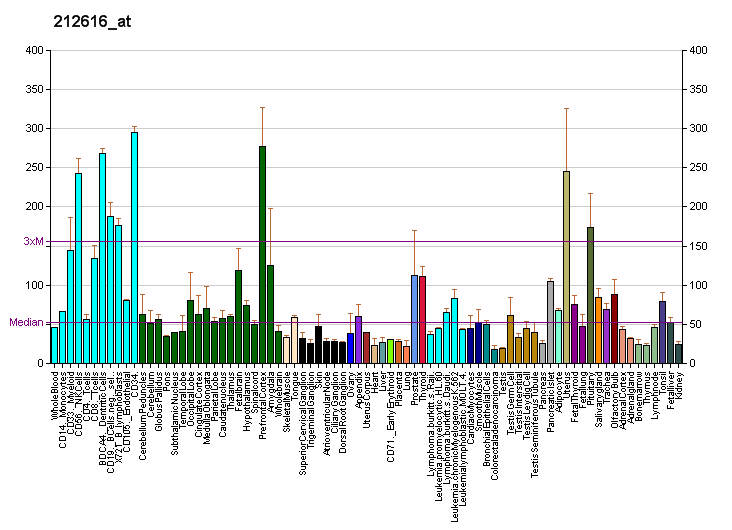
RNA expression pattern
Bgee	Human / Mouse (ortholog); Top expressed in: Achilles tendon; tibia; mucosa of paranasal sinus; tendon of biceps brachii; skin of hip; visceral pleura; renal medulla; urethra; pylorus; corpus callosum / Top expressed in: right kidney; esophagus; lip; hand; aortic valve; zygote; ascending aorta; otolith organ; utricle; secondary oocyte; More reference expression data
BioGPS	More reference expression data
Gene ontology
Molecular function	DNA binding; nucleotide binding; hydrolase activity, acting on acid anhydrides; protein binding; ATP binding; hydrolase activity; helicase activity
Cellular component	nucleoplasm; nucleus; cytoplasm
Biological process	regulation of transcription, DNA-templated; transcription, DNA-templated; regulation of lipid metabolic process; chromatin organization
Sources:Amigo / QuickGO
Orthologs
Databases	NCBI: entry; OMA: entry
Species	Human	Mouse
Entrez	80205	109151
Ensembl	ENSG00000177200	ENSMUSG00000056608
UniProt	Q3L8U1	Q8BYH8
RefSeq (mRNA)	NM_001308319; NM_015287; NM_025134; NM_001352127; NM_001352156 NM_001352157; NM_001352158; NM_001382353; NM_001382354; NM_001382355	NM_177224; NM_001310530
RefSeq (protein)	NP_001295248; NP_079410; NP_001339056; NP_001339085; NP_001339086 NP_001339087; NP_001369282; NP_001369283; NP_001369284	NP_001297459; NP_796198
Location (UCSC)	Chr 16: 53.05 – 53.33 Mb	Chr 8: 91.55 – 91.78 Mb
PubMed search
- Wikidata
View/Edit Human	View/Edit Mouse

Chromodomain-helicase-DNA-binding protein 9 is an enzyme that in humans is encoded by the CHD9 gene.
