= HELZ2 =

Human gene

Identifiers
- Aliases: HELZ2, PDIP-1, PRIC285, helicase with zinc finger 2
- External IDs: OMIM: 611265; MGI: 2385169; GeneCards: HELZ2
Enzyme activity
EC #	BRENDA	ExPASy	KEGG	MetaCyc
3.1.13.1	↗	↗	↗	↗
5.6.2.6	↗	↗	↗	↗

Gene location (Human)
Chr.	Chromosome 20 (human)
Band	20q13.33	Start	63,558,086 bp
Band	20q13.33	End	63,574,239 bp

Gene location (Mouse)
Chr.	Chromosome 2 (mouse)
Band	2|2 H4	Start	180,869,408 bp
Band	2|2 H4	End	180,883,820 bp
RNA expression pattern
Bgee	Human / Mouse (ortholog); Top expressed in: granulocyte; bone marrow cell; blood; sural nerve; appendix; monocyte; stromal cell of endometrium; spleen; apex of heart; upper lobe of left lung / Top expressed in: lymph node; epithelium of small intestine; mesenteric lymph nodes; spleen; submandibular gland; left lobe of liver; blood; Paneth cell; subcutaneous adipose tissue; intestinal villus; More reference expression data
BioGPS	n/a
Gene ontology
Molecular function	DNA binding; nucleotide binding; protein binding; ATP binding; hydrolase activity; helicase activity; nuclear receptor coactivator activity; metal ion binding; RNA binding; ribonuclease activity
Cellular component	membrane; nucleus; nucleoplasm; cytoplasm
Biological process	regulation of transcription, DNA-templated; transcription, DNA-templated; positive regulation of transcription by RNA polymerase II; regulation of lipid metabolic process; nuclear-transcribed mRNA catabolic process, nonsense-mediated decay; RNA phosphodiester bond hydrolysis
Sources:Amigo / QuickGO
Orthologs
Databases	NCBI: entry; OMA: entry
Species	Human	Mouse
Entrez	85441	229003
Ensembl	ENSG00000130589	ENSMUSG00000027580
UniProt	Q9BYK8	E9QAM5
RefSeq (mRNA)	NM_001037335; NM_033405	NM_183162
RefSeq (protein)	NP_001032412; NP_208384	NP_898985
Location (UCSC)	Chr 20: 63.56 – 63.57 Mb	Chr 2: 180.87 – 180.88 Mb
PubMed search
- Wikidata
View/Edit Human	View/Edit Mouse

Helicase with zinc finger 2 is a protein that in humans is encoded by the gene HELZ2 (previously PRIC285).

The protein encoded by this gene is a nuclear transcriptional co-activator for the nuclear receptor peroxisome proliferator-activated receptor alpha (PPARA). The encoded protein contains a zinc finger and is a helicase that appears to be part of the peroxisome proliferator activated receptor alpha interacting complex. This gene is a member of the DNA2/NAM7 helicase gene family. Alternatively spliced transcript variants encoding different isoforms have been found for this gene.
