= Small nucleolar SNORD12/SNORD106 =

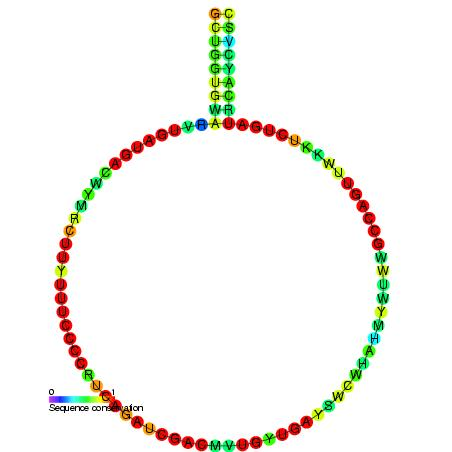
- Predicted secondary structure and sequence conservation of SNORD12

Identifiers
- Symbol: SNORD12
- Alt. Symbols: SNORD106; snoHBII-99
- Rfam: RF00581

Other data
- RNA type: Gene; snRNA; snoRNA; C/D-box
- Domain: Eukaryota
- GO: GO:0006396 GO:0005730
- SO: SO:0000593
- PDB structures: PDBe

In molecular biology, the small nucleolar RNAs SNORD106 and SNORD12 (also known as U106 and HBII-99 respectively ) are two related snoRNAs which belongs to the C/D class of small nucleolar RNAs (snoRNAs). Both contain the conserved C (UGAUGA) and D (CUGA) box sequence motifs

Human SNORD12 (HBII-99) is the homologue of mouse snoRNA MBII-99. In humans both HB11-99 and U106 snoRNAs share the same host gene.

Most of the members of the box C/D family function in directing site-specific 2'-O-methylation of substrate RNAs. HBII-99 is predicted to guide the 2'O-ribose methylation of 28S rRNA G3878. U106 contains conserved antisense elements which would predict U106 methylates residues G1536 and U1602 of 18S rRNA. However, these targets do not appear to be methylated and U106 might function as an RNA chaperone during rRNA folding. A similar role has been suggested for the H/ACA snoRNAs U17a and U17b
