= DNA2L =

Protein-coding gene in the species Homo sapiens

DNA2

Identifiers
- Aliases: DNA2, DNA2L, hDNA replication helicase/nuclease 2
- External IDs: OMIM: 601810; MGI: 2443732; GeneCards: DNA2
Available structures
PDB	Ortholog search: PDBe RCSB
PDB	List of PDB id codes 5EAY
Enzyme activity
EC #	BRENDA	ExPASy	KEGG	MetaCyc
5.6.2.3	↗	↗	↗	↗

Gene location (Human)
Chr.	Chromosome 10 (human)
Band	10q21.3	Start	68,414,064 bp
Band	10q21.3	End	68,472,121 bp

Gene location (Mouse)
Chr.	Chromosome 10 (mouse)
Band	10|10 B4	Start	62,782,805 bp
Band	10|10 B4	End	62,809,964 bp
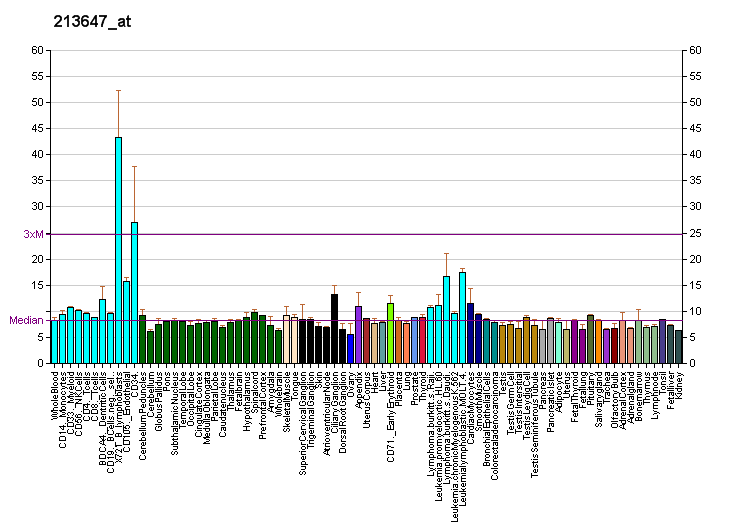
RNA expression pattern
Bgee	Human / Mouse (ortholog); Top expressed in: secondary oocyte; gonad; testicle; ventricular zone; ganglionic eminence; right lobe of liver; Epithelium of choroid plexus; rectum; trabecular bone; stromal cell of endometrium / Top expressed in: fetal liver hematopoietic progenitor cell; primitive streak; abdominal wall; otic placode; epiblast; otic vesicle; tibiofemoral joint; migratory enteric neural crest cell; mandibular prominence; medial ganglionic eminence; More reference expression data
BioGPS	More reference expression data
Gene ontology
Molecular function	DNA binding; 4 iron, 4 sulfur cluster binding; nucleotide binding; helicase activity; iron-sulfur cluster binding; metal ion binding; 5'-flap endonuclease activity; DNA helicase activity; ATPase activity; protein binding; catalytic activity; 5'-3' DNA helicase activity; nuclease activity; endonuclease activity; site-specific endodeoxyribonuclease activity, specific for altered base; hydrolase activity; ATP binding; single-stranded DNA helicase activity; RNA binding
Cellular component	nucleoplasm; gamma DNA polymerase complex; mitochondrial nucleoid; nucleus; mitochondrion; cytoplasm
Biological process	mitotic telomere maintenance via semi-conservative replication; mitochondrial DNA repair; nucleic acid phosphodiester bond hydrolysis; DNA double-strand break processing; mitochondrial DNA replication; cellular response to DNA damage stimulus; DNA replication checkpoint signaling; positive regulation of DNA replication; metabolism; base-excision repair; DNA replication, removal of RNA primer; DNA replication; telomere maintenance; DNA duplex unwinding; DNA repair; G-quadruplex DNA unwinding; t-circle formation; telomere maintenance via semi-conservative replication; DNA replication, Okazaki fragment processing; replication fork reversal; regulation of signal transduction by p53 class mediator
Sources:Amigo / QuickGO
Orthologs
Databases	NCBI: entry; OMA: entry
Species	Human	Mouse
Entrez	1763	327762
Ensembl	ENSG00000138346	ENSMUSG00000036875
UniProt	P51530	Q6ZQJ5
RefSeq (mRNA)	NM_001080449	NM_177372
RefSeq (protein)	NP_001073918	NP_796346
Location (UCSC)	Chr 10: 68.41 – 68.47 Mb	Chr 10: 62.78 – 62.81 Mb
PubMed search
- Wikidata
View/Edit Human	View/Edit Mouse

DNA2-like helicase is an enzyme that in humans is encoded by the DNA2 gene. Dna2, a homolog of DNA2KL present in budding yeast, possesses both helicase and nuclease activity, with which it helps catalyze early steps in homologous recombination.
