= RNF8 =

Protein-coding gene in the species Homo sapiens

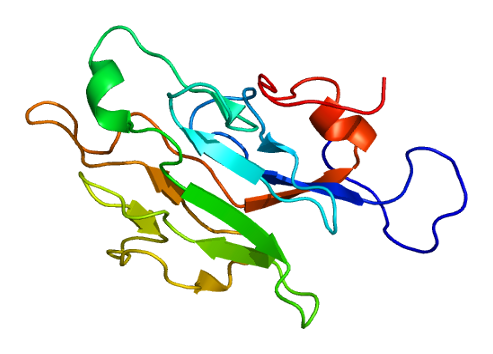

Identifiers
- Aliases: RNF8, hring finger protein 8
- External IDs: OMIM: 611685; MGI: 1929069; GeneCards: RNF8
Available structures
| PDB | Ortholog search: PDBe RCSB |
| PDB | List of PDB id codes 2CSW, 2PIE, 4AYC, 4ORH, 4WHV |
Enzyme activity
| EC # | BRENDA | ExPASy | KEGG | MetaCyc |
|---|---|---|---|---|
| 2.3.2.27 | ↗ | ↗ | ↗ | ↗ |

Gene location (Human)
| Chr. | Chromosome 6 (human) |
| Band | 6p21.2 | Start | 37,353,979 bp |
| Band | 6p21.2 | End | 37,394,734 bp |

Gene location (Mouse)
| Chr. | Chromosome 17 (mouse) |
| Band | 17|17 A3.3 | Start | 29,833,764 bp |
| Band | 17|17 A3.3 | End | 29,863,965 bp |
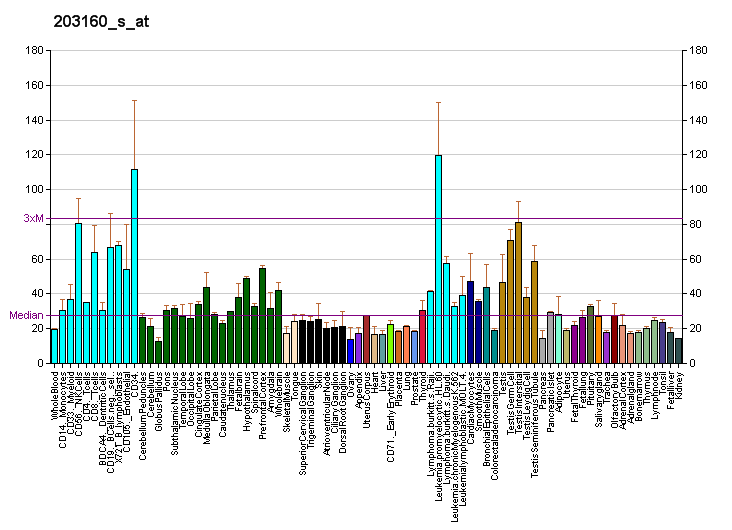

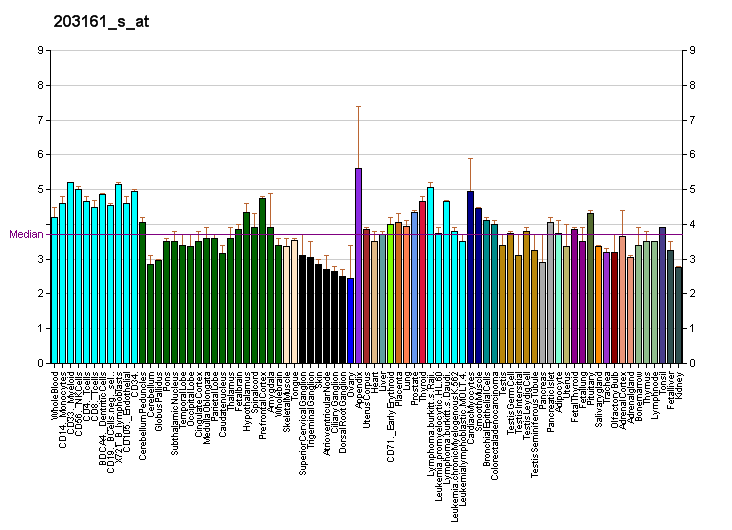
RNA expression pattern
| Bgee | Human / Mouse (ortholog); Top expressed in: ganglionic eminence; cerebellar hemisphere; left testis; right testis; ventricular zone; islet of Langerhans; prefrontal cortex; gonad; right hemisphere of cerebellum; mucosa of esophagus / Top expressed in: primary oocyte; secondary oocyte; zygote; tail of embryo; fetal liver hematopoietic progenitor cell; maxillary prominence; neural layer of retina; endocardial cushion; mandibular prominence; superior cervical ganglion; More reference expression data |
| BioGPS | More reference expression data |
Gene ontology
| Molecular function | protein homodimerization activity; histone binding; chromatin binding; metal ion binding; ubiquitin-protein transferase activity; protein binding; ubiquitin protein ligase binding; transferase activity; identical protein binding; zinc ion binding; ubiquitin binding; ubiquitin protein ligase activity |
| Cellular component | site of double-strand break; ubiquitin ligase complex; nucleoplasm; chromosome; telomere; midbody; nucleus; cytosol; cytoplasm |
| Biological process | response to ionizing radiation; histone H2A ubiquitination; interstrand cross-link repair; ubiquitin-dependent protein catabolic process; protein K63-linked ubiquitination; positive regulation of DNA repair; histone H2A K63-linked ubiquitination; negative regulation of transcription elongation from RNA polymerase II promoter; cellular response to DNA damage stimulus; cell division; protein K48-linked ubiquitination; isotype switching; protein ubiquitination; spermatid development; cell cycle; histone H2B ubiquitination; double-strand break repair via nonhomologous end joining; histone exchange; protein autoubiquitination; double-strand break repair; DNA repair; chromatin organization |
Sources:Amigo / QuickGO
Orthologs
| Databases | NCBI: entry; OMA: entry |
| Species | Human | Mouse |
| Entrez | 9025 | 58230 |
| Ensembl | ENSG00000112130 | ENSMUSG00000090083 |
| UniProt | O76064 | Q8VC56 |
| RefSeq (mRNA) | NM_003958; NM_183078 | NM_021419 |
| RefSeq (protein) | NP_003949; NP_898901 | NP_067394 |
| Location (UCSC) | Chr 6: 37.35 – 37.39 Mb | Chr 17: 29.83 – 29.86 Mb |
| PubMed search |
- Wikidata
| View/Edit Human | View/Edit Mouse |

E3 ubiquitin-protein ligase RNF8 is an enzyme that in humans is encoded by the RNF8 gene. RNF8 has activity both in immune system functions and in DNA repair.

== Function ==
The protein encoded by this gene contains a RING finger motif and an FHA domain. This protein has been shown to interact with several class II ubiquitin-conjugating enzymes (E2), including UBE2E1/UBCH6, UBE2E2, and UBE2E3, and may act as a ubiquitin ligase (E3) in the ubiquitination of certain nuclear proteins. Alternatively spliced transcript variants encoding distinct isoforms have been reported.

RNF8 promotes repair of DNA damage through three DNA repair pathways: homologous recombinational repair (HRR), non-homologous end joining (NHEJ), and nucleotide excision repair (NER). DNA damage is considered to be the primary cause of cancer, and deficiency in DNA repair can cause mutations leading to cancer. A deficiency in RNF8 predisposes mice to cancer.

== Chromatin remodeling ==
After the occurrence of a double-strand break in DNA, the chromatin needs to be relaxed to allow DNA repair, either by HRR or by NHEJ. There are two pathways that result in chromatin relaxation, one initiated by PARP1 and one initiated by γH2AX (the phosphorylated form of the H2AX protein) (see Chromatin remodeling). Chromatin remodeling initiated by γH2AX depends on RNF8, as described below.

The histone variant H2AX constitutes about 10% of the H2A histones in human chromatin. At the site of a DNA double-strand break, the extent of chromatin with phosphorylated γH2AX is about two million base pairs.

γH2AX does not, by itself, cause chromatin decondensation, but within seconds of irradiation the protein "Mediator of the DNA damage checkpoint 1" (MDC1) specifically attaches to γH2AX. This is accompanied by simultaneous accumulation of RNF8 protein and the DNA repair protein NBS1 which bind to MDC1. RNF8 mediates extensive chromatin decondensation through its subsequent interaction with CHD4 protein, a component of the nucleosome remodeling and deacetylase complex NuRD.

== RNF8 in Homologous Recombinational Repair ==
DNA end resection is a pivotal step in HRR repair that produces 3' overhangs that provide a platform to recruit proteins involved in HRR repair. The MRN complex, consisting of Mre11, Rad50 and NBS1, carries out the initial steps of this end resection. RNF8 ubiquitinates NBS1 (both before and after DNA damage occurs), and this ubiquitination is required for effective homologous recombinational repair. Ubiquitination of NBS1 by RNF8 is, however, not required for the role of NBS1 in another DNA repair process, the error-prone microhomology-mediated end joining DNA repair.

RNF8 appears to have other roles in HRR as well. RNF8, acting as a ubiquitin ligase, mono-ubiquitinates γH2AX to tether DNA repair molecules at DNA lesions. In particular, RNF8 activity is required to recruit BRCA1 for homologous recombination repair.

== RNF8 in Non-Homologous End Joining ==
Ku protein is a dimeric protein complex, a heterodimer of two polypeptides, Ku70 and Ku80. Ku protein forms a ring structure. An early step in non-homologous end joining DNA repair of a double-strand break is the slipping of a Ku protein (with its ring protein structure) over each end of the broken DNA. The two Ku proteins, one on each broken end, bind to each other and form a bridge. This protects the DNA ends and forms a platform for further DNA repair enzymes to operate. After the broken ends are rejoined, the two Ku proteins still encircle the now intact DNA and can no longer slip off an end. The Ku proteins must be removed or they cause loss of cell viability. The removal of Ku protein is performed either by RNF8 ubiquitination of Ku80, allowing it to be released from the Ku protein ring, or else by NEDD8 promoted ubiquitination of Ku protein, causing its release from DNA.

== RNF8 in Nucleotide Excision Repair ==
UV-induced formation of pyrimidine dimers in DNA can lead to cell death unless the lesions are repaired. Most repair of these lesions is by nucleotide excision repair. After UV-irradiation, RNF8 is recruited to sites of UV-induced DNA damage and ubiquitinates chromatin component histone H2A. These responses provide partial protection against UV irradiation.

== Impaired spermatogenesis ==
Spermatogenesis is the process in which spermatozoa are produced from spermatogonial stem cells by way of mitosis and meiosis. A major function of meiosis is homologous recombinational repair of this germline DNA. RNF8 plays an essential role in signaling the presence of DNA double-strand breaks. Male mice with a gene knockout for RNF8 have impaired spermatogenesis, apparently due to a defect in homologous recombinational repair.

== Interactions ==
RNF8 has been shown to interact with Retinoid X receptor alpha.

== See also ==
- RING finger domain
