= DNA end resection =

Process involved in DNA repair

DNA end resection, also called 5′–3′ ("five-prime to three-prime") degradation, is a biochemical process where the blunt end of a section of double-stranded DNA (dsDNA) is modified by cutting away some nucleotides from the 5' end to produce a 3' single-stranded sequence. The presence of a section of single-stranded DNA (ssDNA) allows the broken end of the DNA to line up with a matching sequence, so that it can be accurately repaired.

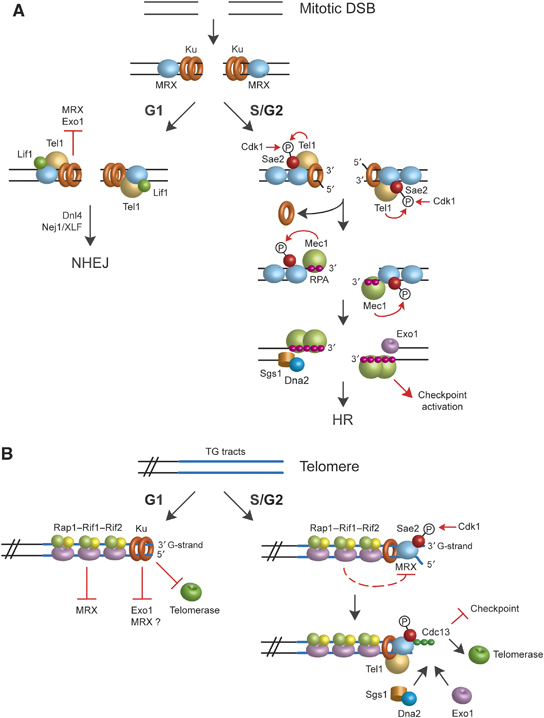
Mechanism of regulation of 5' resection of mitotic and telomeric DSBs.

Double-strand breaks (DSBs) can occur at any phase of the cell cycle, causing DNA end resection and repair activities to take place, but they are also normal intermediates in mitotic recombination. Furthermore, the natural ends of the linear eukaryotic chromosomes resemble DSBs, and although DNA breaks can cause damage to the integrity of genomic DNA, the natural ends are packed into complex protective packages called telomeres that prevent DNA repair activities. Telomeres and mitotic DSBs have different functionality, but both experience the same 5′–3′ degradation process.

== Background ==
A double-strand break is a kind of DNA damage in which both strands in the double helix are severed. DSBs only occur during DNA replication of the cell cycle. Furthermore, DSBs can lead to genome rearrangements and instability. Cases where two complementary strands are linked at the point of the DSB have potential to be catastrophic, such that the cell will not be able to complete mitosis when it next divides, and will either die or, in rare cases, undergo chromosomal loss, duplications, and even mutations. Three mechanisms exist to repair DSBs: non-homologous end joining (NHEJ), microhomology-mediated end joining (MMEJ), and homologous recombination HR. Of these, only NHEJ does not rely on DNA end resection.

== Mechanism ==
Accurate repair of DSBs is essential for maintenance of genome integrity. Out of the three mechanisms for DSB repair, NHEJ and HR repair mechanisms are the dominant pathways. Several highly conserved proteins trigger the DNA damage checkpoint for detection of DSBs. The NHEJ mechanism functions by ligating two different DSBs with high fidelity, while HR relies on a homologous template to repair DSB ends.

DNA end resection in the HR pathway requires the presence of sister chromatids. This means that it only occurs at two specific cell cycle phases: the S phase and the G2 phase. DSBs that have not begun DNA end resection can be ligated by the NHEJ pathway, but resection of a few nucleotides inhibits the NHEJ pathway and commits DNA repair to the HR pathway. The NHEJ pathway is involved throughout the cell cycle, but it is critical to DNA repair during the G1 phase. In the G1 phase, there are no sister chromatids present for use by the HR pathway, making the NHEJ pathway a critical repair mechanism.

Before resection can take place, the break needs to be detected. In animals, this detection is done by PARP1; similar systems exist in other eukaryotes: in plants, PARP2 seems to play this role. PARP binding then recruits the MRN complex to the breakage site. This is a highly conserved complex consisting of Mre11, Rad50 and NBS1 (known as Nibrin in mammals, or Xrs2 in yeast, where this complex is called the MRX complex).

Before resection can start, CtBP1-interacting protein (CtIP) needs to bind to the MRN complex so that the first phase of resection can begin, namely short-range end resection. After phosphorylated CtIP binds, the Mre11 subunit is able to cut the 5'-terminated strand endonucleolytically, probably about 300 base pairs from the end, and then acts as a 3'→5' exonuclease to strip away the end of the 5' strand.

== Resection of telomere DSBs ==
Linear chromosomes are packed into complex specialized DNA protective packages called telomeres. The structure of telomeres is highly conserved and is organized in multiple short tandem DNA repeats. Telomeres and DSBs have different functionality, such that telomeres prevent DNA repair activities. During telomeric DNA replication in the S/G2 and G1 phases of the cell cycle, the 3' lagging strand leaves a short overhang called a G-tail. Telomeric DNA ends at the 3' G tail end because the 3' lagging strand extends without its complementary 5' C leading strand. The G tail provide a major function to telomeric DNA such that the G tails control telomere homeostasis.

=== Telomeres in G1 phase ===
In the G1 phase of the cell cycle, the telomere-associated proteins RIF1, RIF2, and RAP2 bind to telomeric DNA and prevent access to the MRX complex. Such process in S. Cerevisiae for example is negatively regulated by this activity. The MRX complex and the Ku complex bind simultaneously and independently to DSBs ends. In the presence of the telomere-associated proteins, MRX fails to bind to the DSB ends while the Ku complex binds to DSB ends. The bound Ku complex to the DSB ends protect the telomeres from nucleolytic degradation by exo1. This results in an inhibition of telomerase elongation at the DSB ends and prevents further telomere action at the G1 phase of the cell cycle.

=== Telomeres in the late S/G2 phase ===
In the late S/G2 phase of the cell cycle, the telomere-associated proteins RIF1, RIF2, and RAP2 exhibit their inhibitory effect by binding to telomeric DNA. In the Late S/G2 phase, the protein kinase CDK1 (cyclin-dependent) promotes telomeric resection. This control is exerted by cyclin-dependent kinases, which phosphorylate parts of the resection machinery. This process alleviates the inhibitory effect of the telomere-associated proteins, and allows Cdc13 (a binding protein on both the lagging strand, and leading strand) to cover telomeric DNA. The binding of cdc13 to DNA suppresses DNA damage checkpoint and allows resection to occur while allowing for telomerase elongation at the DSB ends.

== Resection of mitotic DSBs ==
One of the important regulatory controls in mitotic cells is deciding which specific DSB repair pathway to take. Once a DSB is detected, the highly conserved complexes are recruited by the DNA ends. If the cell is in the G1 phase of the cell cycle, the complex Ku prevents resection to occur and triggers the NHEJ pathway factors. DSBs in the NHEJ pathway are ligated, a step in the NHEJ pathway that requires DNA ligase activity of Dnl4-Lif1/XRCC4 heterodimer and the Nej1/XLF protein. This process results in error-prone religation of DSB ends at the G1 phase of the cell cycle.

If the cells are in S/G2 phase, mitotic DSBs are controlled through Cdk1 activity and involves phosphorylation of Sae2 Ser267. After phosphorylation occurs by Cdk1, MRX complex binds to dsDNA ends and generates short ssDNA that stretches in the 5' direction. The 5' ssDNA continues resection by the activity of the helicase enzyme, Sgs1 enzyme, and the nucleases Exo1 and Dna2. Involvement of Sae2 Sar267 in DSB processing is highly conserved throughout eukaryotes, such that the Sae2 along with the MRX complex are involved in two major functions: single-strand annealing, and processing of hairpin DNA structures. Like all ssDNA in the nucleus, the resected region is first coated by Replication protein A (RPA) complex, but RPA is then replaced with RAD51 to form a nucleoprotein filament which can take part in the search for a matching region, allowing HR to take place. The 3' ssDNA coated by a RPA promotes the recruitment of Mec1. Mec1 further phosphorylates Sae2 along with cdk1. The resulting phosphorylation by Sae2 by Mec1 helps increase the effect of resection and this in turn leads to the DNA damage checkpoint activation.

== Regulators ==
The pathway of choice in DNA repair is highly regulated to guarantee that cells in the S/G2 and G1 phase use the appropriate mechanism. Regulators in both the NHEJ and HR pathway mediate the appropriate DNA repair response pathway. Furthermore, recent studies into DNA repair show that regulation of DNA end resection is governed by the activity of cdk1 in the cell replication cycle.

=== NHEJ pathway ===
DNA end resection is key in determining the correct pathway in NHEJ. For NHEJ pathway to occur, positive regulators such as the Ku and MRX complex mediate recruitment of other NHEJ-associated proteins such as Tel1, Lif1, Dnl4, and Nej1. Since NHEJ does not rely on end resection, NHEJ could only happen in the G1 phase of the cell cycle. Both Ku and NHEJ-associated proteins prevent initiation of resection.

Resection ensures that DSBs are not repaired by NHEJ (which joins broken DNA ends together without ensuring that they match), but rather by methods based on homology (matching DNA sequences). Cyclin-dependent protein kinase such as cdk1 in yeast serves as a negative regulator of the NHEJ pathway. Any activity associated with the presence of cyclin dependent protein kinases inhibit the NHEJ pathway

=== Positive regulators ===
The presence of a ssDNA allows the broken end of the DNA to line up accurately with a matching sequence, so that it can be accurately repaired. For HR pathway to occur in the S and G2 phases of the cell cycle, availability of a sister chromatid is required. 5′–3′ resection automatically links a DSB to the HR pathway. Cyclin-dependent protein kinase such as cdk1 serve as a positive regulator of the HR pathway. This positive regulator promotes 5′–3′ nucleolytic degradation of DNA ends. Along with cdk1, the MRX complex, B1 cyclin, and Spo11-induced DSBs serve as a positive regulators to the HR pathway.

== See also ==
- Exonuclease
- Double-strand breaks
- Blunt ends
- Non-homologous end joining
- Nucleotide
- Cell cycle
- Telomere
- NHEJ
- Homologous Recombination
- Microhomology-mediated end joining
