= H2AFX =

Histone protein from the H2A family

H2AX

Identifiers
- Aliases: H2AX, H2A.X, H2A/X, H2A histone family member X, H2A.X variant histone, H2AFX
- External IDs: OMIM: 601772; MGI: 102688; GeneCards: H2AX
Available structures
PDB	Ortholog search: PDBe RCSB
PDB	List of PDB id codes 2D31, 2DYP, 3SHV, 3SQD, 3SZM, 1YDP, 2AZM, 3U3Z

Gene location (Human)
Chr.	Chromosome 11 (human)
Band	11q23.3	Start	119,093,874 bp
Band	11q23.3	End	119,095,465 bp

Gene location (Mouse)
Chr.	Chromosome 9 (mouse)
Band	9 A5.2|9 24.84 cM	Start	44,245,991 bp
Band	9 A5.2|9 24.84 cM	End	44,247,374 bp
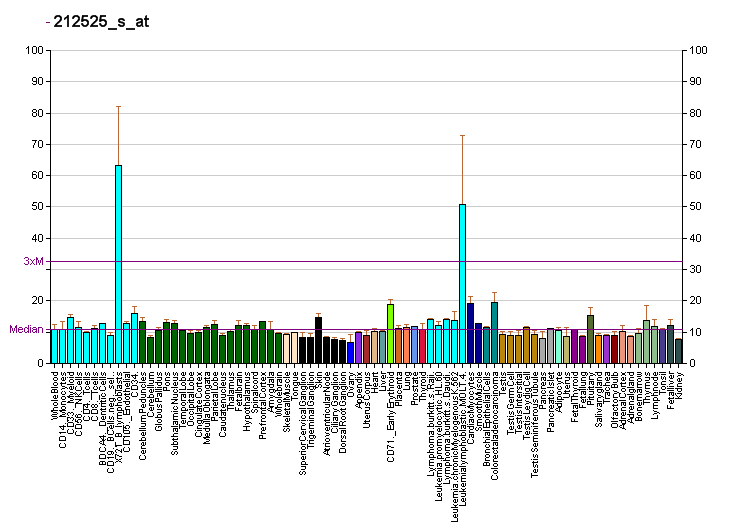

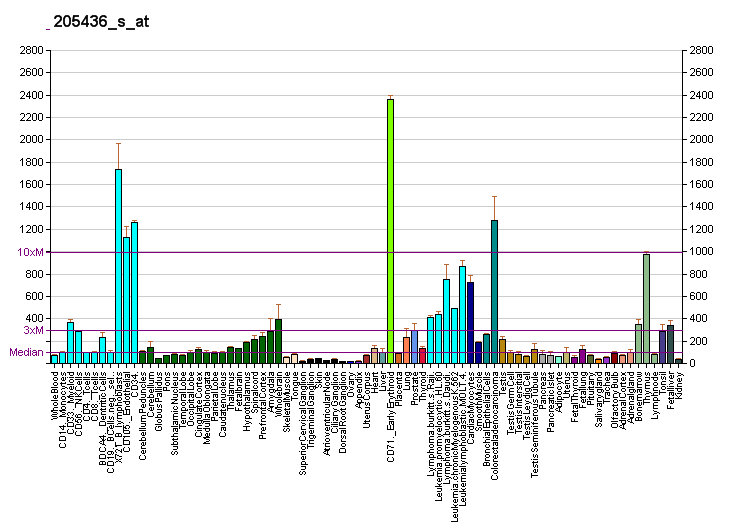
RNA expression pattern
Bgee	Human / Mouse (ortholog); Top expressed in: ventricular zone; embryo; ganglionic eminence; mucosa of transverse colon; oocyte; inferior ganglion of vagus nerve; thymus; trabecular bone; C1 segment; subthalamic nucleus / Top expressed in: medial ganglionic eminence; abdominal wall; maxillary prominence; mandibular prominence; tail of embryo; tibiofemoral joint; genital tubercle; epiblast; somite; ventricular zone; More reference expression data
BioGPS	More reference expression data
Gene ontology
Molecular function	DNA binding; histone binding; protein binding; protein heterodimerization activity; enzyme binding; damaged DNA binding
Cellular component	nucleoplasm; chromosome; telomere; nucleosome; extracellular exosome; nuclear speck; centrosome; nucleus; site of double-strand break; chromatin; condensed nuclear chromosome; male germ cell nucleus; XY body; replication fork; site of DNA damage
Biological process	response to ionizing radiation; nucleosome assembly; DNA recombination; DNA damage checkpoint signaling; positive regulation of DNA repair; cellular response to DNA damage stimulus; cellular senescence; meiosis; cellular response to gamma radiation; spermatogenesis; cerebral cortex development; cell cycle; viral process; double-strand break repair via nonhomologous end joining; double-strand break repair; DNA repair; double-strand break repair via homologous recombination; chromatin organization
Sources:Amigo / QuickGO
Orthologs
Databases	NCBI: entry; OMA: entry
Species	Human	Mouse
Entrez	3014	15270
Ensembl	ENSG00000188486	ENSMUSG00000049932
UniProt	P16104	P27661
RefSeq (mRNA)	NM_002105	NM_010436
RefSeq (protein)	NP_002096	NP_034566
Location (UCSC)	Chr 11: 119.09 – 119.1 Mb	Chr 9: 44.25 – 44.25 Mb
PubMed search
- Wikidata
View/Edit Human	View/Edit Mouse

H2A histone family member X (usually abbreviated as H2AX) is a type of histone protein from the H2A family encoded by the H2AFX gene. An important phosphorylated form is γH2AX (S139), which forms when double-strand breaks appear.

In humans and other eukaryotes, the DNA is wrapped around histone octamers, consisting of core histones H2A, H2B, H3 and H4, to form chromatin. H2AX contributes to nucleosome-formation, chromatin-remodeling and DNA repair, and is also used in vitro as an assay for double-strand breaks in dsDNA.

== Post-translational modifications ==
H2AX becomes phosphorylated on serine 139, then called γH2AX, as a reaction on DNA double-strand breaks (DSB). The kinases of the PI3-family (Ataxia telangiectasia mutated, ATR and DNA-PKcs) are responsible for this phosphorylation, especially ATM. The modification can happen accidentally during replication fork collapse or in the response to ionizing radiation but also during controlled physiological processes such as V(D)J recombination. γH2AX is a sensitive target for looking at DSBs in cells. The presence of γH2AX by itself, however, is not the evidence of the DSBs. The role of the phosphorylated form of the histone in DNA repair is under discussion but it is known that because of the modification the DNA becomes less condensed, potentially allowing space for the recruitment of proteins necessary during repair of DSBs. Mutagenesis experiments have shown that the modification is necessary for the proper formation of ionizing radiation induced foci in response to double strand breaks, but is not required for the recruitment of proteins to the site of DSBs.

== Function ==
=== DNA damage response ===
The histone variant H2AX constitutes about 2–25% of the H2A histones in mammalian chromatin. When a double-strand break occurs in DNA, a sequence of events occurs in which H2AX is altered.

Very early after a double-strand break, a specific protein that interacts with and affects the architecture of chromatin is phosphorylated and then released from the chromatin. This protein, heterochromatin protein 1 (HP1)-beta (CBX1), is bound to histone H3 methylated on lysine 9 (H3K9me). Half-maximum release of HP1-beta from damaged DNA occurs within one second. A dynamic alteration in chromatin structure is triggered by HP1-beta release. This alteration in chromatin structure promotes H2AX phosphorylation by ATM, ATR and DNA-PK, allowing formation of γH2AX (H2AX phosphorylated on serine 139). γH2AX can be detected as soon as 20 seconds after irradiation of cells (with DNA double-strand break formation), and half maximum accumulation of γH2AX occurs in one minute. Chromatin with phosphorylated γH2AX extends to about a million base pairs on each side of a DNA double-strand break.

MDC1 (mediator of DNA damage checkpoint protein 1) then binds to γH2AX and the γH2AX/MDC1 complex then orchestrates further interactions in double-strand break repair. The ubiquitin ligases RNF8 and RNF168 bind to the γH2AX/MDC1 complex, ubiquitylating other chromatin components. This allows the recruitment of BRCA1 and 53BP1 to the long, modified γH2AX/MDC1 chromatin. Other proteins that stably assemble on the extensive γH2AX-modified chromatin are the MRN complex (a protein complex consisting of Mre11, Rad50 and Nbs1), RAD51 and the ATM kinase. Further DNA repair components, such as RAD52 and RAD54, rapidly and reversibly interact with the core components stably associated with γH2AX-modified chromatin. The constitutive level of γH2AX expression in live cells, untreated by exogenous agents, likely represents DNA damage by endogenous oxidants generated during cellular respiration.

=== Chromatin remodeling ===
The packaging of eukaryotic DNA into chromatin presents a barrier to all DNA-based processes that require recruitment of enzymes to their sites of action. To allow DNA repair, the chromatin must be remodeled.

γH2AX, the phosphorylated form of H2AX, is involved in the steps leading to chromatin decondensation after DNA double-strand breaks. γH2AX does not, itself, cause chromatin decondensation, but within 30 seconds of ionizing radiation, RNF8 protein can be detected in association with γH2AX. RNF8 mediates extensive chromatin decondensation, through its subsequent interaction with CHD4, a component of the nucleosome remodeling and deacetylase complex NuRD.

== Applications ==
=== Marker of double-strand breaks ===
An assay for γH2AX generally reflects the presence of double-strand breaks in DNA, though the assay may indicate other minor phenomena as well. On the one hand, overwhelming evidence supports a strong, quantitative correlation between γH2AX foci formation and DNA double-strand break induction following ionizing radiation exposure, based on absolute yields and distributions induced per unit dose. On the other hand, not only the formation of distinct γH2AX foci but also the induction of pan-nuclear γH2AX signals have been reported as a cellular reaction to various stressors other than ionizing radiation. The γH2AX signal is always stronger at DNA double-strand breaks than in undamaged chromatin. γH2AX in undamaged chromatin is thought to possibly be generated via direct phosphorylation of H2AX by activated kinases, most likely diffusing from DNA damage sites. In using γH2AX as a marker for double strand breaks, it is important to recognize that it is a down-stream proxy that can be useful for representing DNA damage repair. It does not represent double strand breaks themselves and this needs careful consideration when interpreting data from such assays.

The γH2AX-assay has several disadvantages, therefore new assays have been created.

== Interactions ==
H2AX has been shown to interact with:

- BARD1,
- BRCA1
- Bloom syndrome protein,
- MDC1,
- Nibrin, and
- TP53BP1.
