= MDC1 =

Protein-coding gene in the species Homo sapiens

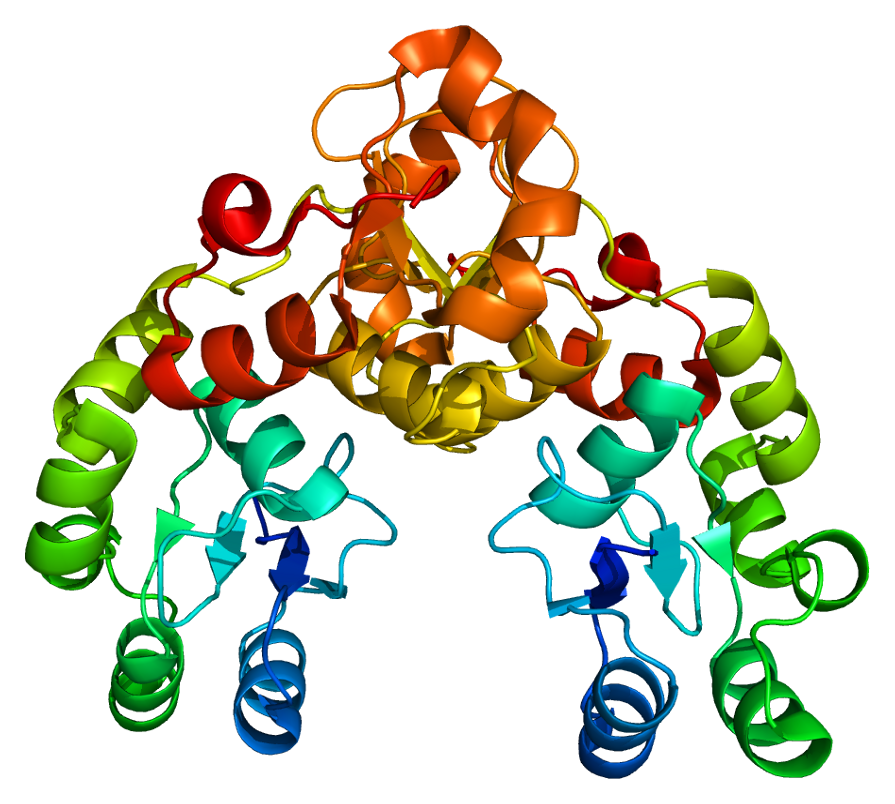

Identifiers
- Aliases: MDC1, NFBD1, mediator of DNA damage checkpoint 1
- External IDs: OMIM: 607593; MGI: 3525201; GeneCards: MDC1
Available structures
PDB	Ortholog search: PDBe RCSB
PDB	List of PDB id codes 2ADO, 2AZM, 2ETX, 3K05, 3UEO, 3UMZ, 3UN0, 3UNM, 3UNN, 3UOT

Gene location (Human)
Chr.	Chromosome 6 (human)
Band	6p21.33	Start	30,699,807 bp
Band	6p21.33	End	30,717,447 bp

Gene location (Mouse)
Chr.	Chromosome 17 (mouse)
Band	17|17 B1	Start	36,152,407 bp
Band	17|17 B1	End	36,170,562 bp
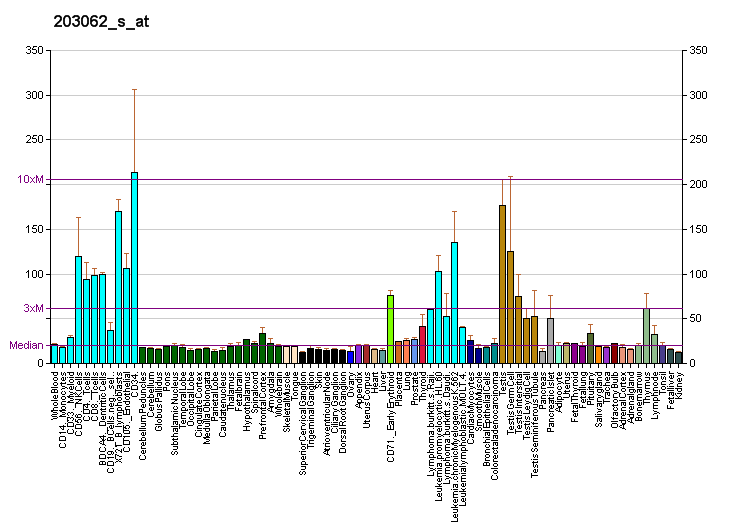

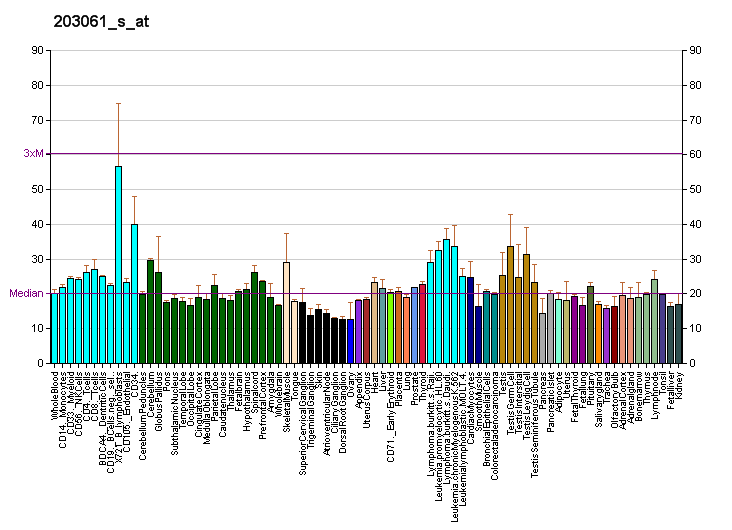
RNA expression pattern
Bgee	Human / Mouse (ortholog); Top expressed in: right testis; left testis; right lobe of thyroid gland; ventricular zone; left lobe of thyroid gland; right ovary; left ovary; gastric mucosa; body of uterus; pituitary gland / Top expressed in: tail of embryo; spermatocyte; genital tubercle; zygote; cumulus cell; spermatid; hand; yolk sac; ventricular zone; neural layer of retina; More reference expression data
BioGPS	More reference expression data
Gene ontology
Molecular function	FHA domain binding; protein C-terminus binding; protein binding; identical protein binding
Cellular component	nucleus; focal adhesion; chromosome; nucleoplasm; nuclear body
Biological process	cellular response to DNA damage stimulus; mitotic intra-S DNA damage checkpoint signaling; cell cycle; double-strand break repair via nonhomologous end joining; DNA repair
Sources:Amigo / QuickGO
Orthologs
Databases	NCBI: entry; OMA: entry
Species	Human	Mouse
Entrez	9656	240087
Ensembl	ENSG00000224587; ENSG00000237095; ENSG00000137337; ENSG00000206481; ENSG00000234012 ENSG00000231135; ENSG00000228575; ENSG00000225589	ENSMUSG00000061607
UniProt	Q14676	Q5PSV9
RefSeq (mRNA)	NM_014641	NM_001010833
RefSeq (protein)	NP_055456	NP_001010833; NP_001392450; NP_001392451; NP_001392452; NP_001392453 NP_001392454; NP_001392455; NP_001392456; NP_001392457; NP_001392458
Location (UCSC)	Chr 6: 30.7 – 30.72 Mb	Chr 17: 36.15 – 36.17 Mb
PubMed search
- Wikidata
View/Edit Human	View/Edit Mouse

Mediator of DNA damage checkpoint protein 1 is a 2080 amino acid long protein that in humans is encoded by the MDC1 gene located on the short arm (p) of chromosome 6. MDC1 protein is a regulator of the Intra-S phase and the G2/M cell cycle checkpoints and recruits repair proteins to the site of DNA damage. It is involved in determining cell survival fate in association with tumor suppressor protein p53. This protein also goes by the name Nuclear Factor with BRCT Domain 1 (NFBD1).

== Function ==
=== Role in DNA damage response ===
The MDC1 gene encodes the MDC1 nuclear protein which is part of the DNA damage response (DDR) pathway, the mechanism through which eukaryotic cells respond to damaged DNA, specifically DNA double-strand breaks (DSB) that are caused by ionizing radiation or chemical clastogens. The DDR of mammalian cells is made up of kinases, and mediator/adaptors factors. In mammalian cells the DDR is a network of pathways made up of proteins that function as either kinases, or and mediator/adaptors that recruit the kinases to their phosphorylation targets, these factors work together to detect DNA damage, and signal the repair mechanism as well as activating cell cycle checkpoints. The MDC1s role in DDR is to function both as a mediator/adaptor protein mediating a complex of other DDR proteins at the site of DNA damage and repairing DNA damage through its PST domain.

When a cell is exposed to ionizing radiation, its chromatin can be damaged with DSB, triggering the DDR which starts with the MRN complex recruiting ATM kinase to the exposed H2AX histones on the damaged DNA. ATM phosphorylates the C-terminus of the H2AX histone (phosphorylated H2AX histones are commonly noted as γH2AX), and they become an epigenetic flag that highlights the site of DNA damage . The SDT domain of the MDC1 protein is phosphorylated by caseine kinase 2 (CK2) which allows it to bind another MRN complex, the MDC1 protein can sense the DNA damage by binding to the γH2AX flag through its BRCT domain and brings the bound MRN complex to the site of damaged DNA and it facilitates the recruitment and retention of another ATM kinase. The second ATM kinase phosphorylates the TQXF domain on MDC1 which allows it to recruit the E3 ubiquitin ligase RNF8, which will ubiquitinate the histones near the DSB which initiates further ubiquitination of the chromatin around the site of damage by other factors of the DDR. This aggregation of DDR factors and concentration of phosphorylated and ubiquitinated histones is called a DNA damage foci or ionizing radiation-induced foci and the main role of MDC1 is to coordinate the creation of DNA damage foci. This protein is required to activate the intra-S phase and G2/M phase cell cycle checkpoints in response to DNA damage.

=== Role in apoptosis ===
MDC1 has anti-apoptotic properties by directly inhibiting the apoptotic activity of the tumor suppressing protein p53. DNA damage can induce apoptosis when the ATM kinase and Chk2 phosphorylate p53 on its Ser-15 and Ser-20 residues which activates p53 and stabilizes it by allowing it to dissociate from the E3 ubiquitin protein ligase MDM2. MDC1 can execute its anti-apoptotic activity by inhibiting p53 in two ways. The MDC1 protein can bind to the n-terminus of p53 through its BRC1 domain which blocks p53 transactivation domain. MDC1 can also inactivate p53 by reducing the phosphorylation levels of p53 Ser-15 residues necessary to p53 apoptotic activity. Studies on lung cancer cell lines (A549 cells) showed an increase in apoptosis in response to genotoxic agents when MDC1 protein levels were reduced with siRNA.

=== Role in meiosis ===
In female mammals, a unique characteristic of meiosis, not observed in other types of cells, is the prolonged arrest during the prophase stage of meiosis I. In oocytes, DNA double-strand breaks can be repaired during meiosis I by a process involving microtubule-dependent recruitment of the CIP2A-MDC1-TOPBP1 complex from spindle pole to chromosomes.

=== Loss of MDC1 protein ===
Inhibition or loss of MDC1 protein through studies with siRNA on human cells or knockout studies in mice have shown several defects at both the cellular and organismal level. Mice lacking MDC1 are smaller, have infertile males, are radiosensitive, and are more susceptible to tumors. Knock out MDC1 mice cells and silenced human cells were radiosensitive, failed to initiate Intra-S phase and G2/M checkpoints, failed to produce ionizing radiation-induced foci had poor phosphorylation by the DRR kinases (ATM, CHK1, CHK2), defects in homologous recombination. Human cells with silenced MDC1 also displayed random plasmid integration, reduced apoptosis, and slowed mitosis.

== Interactions ==
MDC1 has been shown to interact with:

- APC/C,
- ATM,
- CHEK2,
- γH2AX,
- H2AFX,
- MRE11A,
- NBS1,
- RAD51,
- RNF8,
- TOPOα,
- p53, and
- MDM2

MDC1 also binds to mRNA or polyadenylated RNA in the nucleus.

== Protein structure ==
The MDC1 protein contains the following domains listed in order from N-terminal to C-terminal:

- forkhead-associated domain (FHA), N-terminus domain lies between amino acid residues 54 and 105
- SDT (or SDTD) - This domain is located between amino acids 218 and 460.
- TQXF- This domain is located between amino acids 699 and 768.
- PST- This domain lies between amino acid residues 114 and 1662.
- BRCA 1 C-terminus (BRCT) domain and lies between amino acids 1891 and 2082.

FHA domain
Unlike the FHA domains on other DRR factors, the FHA domain on MDC1 is not well-characterized. It has been implicated in DSB repair, Intra-S phase and G2/M checkpoints but the specific mechanism is yet to be determined. The FHA domain does have a few putative MDC1-FHA interacting factors such as ATM, CHK2, and RAD51.
SDT domain
When the SDT domain is phosphorylated it can bind the MRN complex (composed of MRE11/RAD50/NBS1) and is responsible for keeping the MRN complex associated with the DSB chromatin. This domain along with NBS1 of the MRN complex are necessary for the activation of intra-S-phase and the G2/M checkpoints, however their role in the molecular mechanism of checkpoint control has not been resolved.
TQXF domain
This domain is characterized by four threonine-glutamine then a phenylalanine at the 3+ position. ATM phosphorylates this domain allowing it to bind RNF8 an E3 ubiquitin ligase. This MDC1/RNF8 coupling then facilitates the recruitment of other DDR factors such as RNF168, 53BP1, and BRCA1. TQXF is important for proper passage through the G2/M checkpoint, however the molecular mechanism through which MDC1 and RNF8 regulate the G2/M checkpoint has not yet been resolved.
PST domain
The PST domain is composed of repeats of a proline-serine-threonine motif. This domain plays a role in DNA repair by both homologous recombination and by Non-homologous end joining, however the mechanism through which it facilitates repair of damaged DNA is not yet known.
BRCT domain
The BRCT domain on MDC1 directly binds to the γH2AX of damaged chromatin. The BRCT domain creates an α/β fold which extends from the C-terminus of MDC1 through a linker region. It preferentially binds to phosphorylated Ser residues followed by Glu, Tyr, motif on γH2AX. This domain also binds to anaphase-promoting complex (APC/C) which is an E3 ubiquitin ligase that degrades cyclins. The BRCT domain is involved in the regulation of the decatenation checkpoint at the end of replication by binding Topo IIα this arrest the cell in the G2 cycle until the sister chromatin have completely separated. The BRCT domain also interacts the tumor suppressor p53 and inhibits p53 by blocking its transactivation domain, as well as aiding in MDM2 inactivation of p53.

== Regulation ==
MDC1 is indirectly down regulated by the oncogene AKT1. AKT1 activates expression of the microRNA-22 (miR-22) which targets the 3' end of MDC1 mRNA inhibiting translation. Aberrant overexpression of AKT1, which is observed in several cancers including breast, lung and prostate, results in reduced production of MDC1 and subsequently a destabilization of the genome and increased tumorigenicity.

== Role in cancer ==
MDC1 is a putative tumor suppressor. Knockout studies in mice have shown an increase in tumor development when MDC1 is lost. Reduction in MDC1 protein levels has been observed in a large number of breast and lung carcinomas. Several studies on various human cancer cell lines including the A549 cell human lung carcinoma line, multiple esophageal cancer cell lines (TE11, YES2, YES5), and cervical cancer cell lines (HeLa, SiHa, and CaSki) showed increased sensitivity to anti-cancer drugs (adriamycin and cisplatin), when endogenous MDC1 protein levels were knockdown with siRNA. Because of MDC1s involvement in several pathways that are often misappropriated by cancer cells including the cell cycle checkpoints, DDR, and p53 tumor suppression, cancer treatments that target MDC1 have the potential to be potent radiosensitizer and chemosensitizer.
