= DNA repair-deficiency disorder =

- Specialty: Endocrinology

A DNA repair-deficiency disorder is a medical condition due to reduced functionality of DNA repair.

DNA repair defects can cause an accelerated aging disease or an increased risk of cancer, or sometimes both.

== DNA repair defects and accelerated aging ==
DNA repair defects are seen in nearly all of the diseases described as accelerated aging disease, in which various tissues, organs or systems of the human body age prematurely. Because the accelerated aging diseases display different aspects of aging, but never every aspect, they are often called segmental progerias by biogerontologists.

=== Human disorders with accelerated aging ===
- Ataxia-telangiectasia
- Bloom syndrome
- Cockayne syndrome
- Fanconi anemia
- Progeria (Hutchinson–Gilford progeria syndrome)
- Rothmund–Thomson syndrome
- Trichothiodystrophy
- Werner syndrome
- Xeroderma pigmentosum

=== Examples ===
Some examples of DNA repair defects causing progeroid syndromes in humans or mice are shown in Table 1.

Table 1. DNA repair proteins that, when deficient, cause features of accelerated aging (segmental progeria).
Protein	Pathway	Description
ATR	Nucleotide excision repair	deletion of ATR in adult mice leads to a number of disorders including hair loss and graying, kyphosis, osteoporosis, premature involution of the thymus, fibrosis of the heart and kidney and decreased spermatogenesis
DNA-PKcs	Non-homologous end joining	shorter lifespan, earlier onset of aging related pathologies; higher level of DNA damage persistence
ERCC1	Nucleotide excision repair, Interstrand cross link repair	deficient transcription coupled NER with time-dependent accumulation of transcription-blocking damages; mouse life span reduced from 2.5 years to 5 months;) Ercc1^{−/−} mice are leukopenic and thrombocytopenic, and there is extensive adipose transformation of the bone marrow, hallmark features of normal aging in mice
ERCC2 (XPD)	Nucleotide excision repair (also transcription as part of TFIIH)	some mutations in ERCC2 cause Cockayne syndrome in which patients have segmental progeria with reduced stature, intellectual disability, cachexia (loss of subcutaneous fat tissue), sensorineural deafness, retinal degeneration, and calcification of the central nervous system; other mutations in ERCC2 cause trichothiodystrophy in which patients have segmental progeria with brittle hair, short stature, progressive cognitive impairment and abnormal face shape; still other mutations in ERCC2 cause xeroderma pigmentosum (without a progeroid syndrome) and with extreme sun-mediated skin cancer predisposition
ERCC4 (XPF)	Nucleotide excision repair, Interstrand cross link repair, Single-strand annealing, Microhomology-mediated end joining	mutations in ERCC4 cause symptoms of accelerated aging that affect the neurologic, hepatobiliary, musculoskeletal, and hematopoietic systems, and cause an old, wizened appearance, loss of subcutaneous fat, liver dysfunction, vision and hearing loss, chronic kidney disease, muscle wasting, osteopenia, kyphosis and cerebral atrophy
ERCC5 (XPG)	Nucleotide excision repair, Homologous recombinational repair, Base excision repair	mice with deficient ERCC5 show loss of subcutaneous fat, kyphosis, osteoporosis, retinal photoreceptor loss, liver aging, extensive neurodegeneration, and a short lifespan of 4–5 months
ERCC6 (Cockayne syndrome B or CS-B)	Nucleotide excision repair [especially transcription coupled repair (TC-NER) and interstrand crosslink repair]	premature aging features with shorter life span and photosensitivity, deficient transcription coupled NER with accumulation of unrepaired DNA damages, also defective repair of oxidatively generated DNA damages including 8-oxoguanine, 5-hydroxycytosine and cyclopurines
ERCC8 (Cockayne syndrome A or CS-A)	Nucleotide excision repair [especially transcription coupled repair (TC-NER) and interstrand crosslink repair]	premature aging features with shorter life span and photosensitivity, deficient transcription coupled NER with accumulation of unrepaired DNA damages, also defective repair of oxidatively generated DNA damages including 8-oxoguanine, 5-hydroxycytosine and cyclopurines
GTF2H5 (TTDA)	Nucleotide excision repair	deficiency causes trichothiodystrophy (TTD) a premature-ageing and neuroectodermal disease; humans with GTF2H5 mutations have a partially inactivated protein with retarded repair of 6-4-photoproducts
Ku70	Non-homologous end joining	shorter lifespan, earlier onset of aging related pathologies; persistent foci of DNA double-strand break repair proteins
Ku80	Non-homologous end joining	shorter lifespan, earlier onset of aging related pathologies; defective repair of spontaneous DNA damage
Lamin A	Non-homologous end joining, Homologous recombination	increased DNA damage and chromosome aberrations; progeria; aspects of premature aging; altered expression of numerous DNA repair factors
NRMT1	Nucleotide excision repair	mutation in NRMT1 causes decreased body size, female-specific infertility, kyphosis, decreased mitochondrial function, and early-onset liver degeneration
RECQL4	Base excision repair, Nucleotide excision repair, Homologous recombination, Non-homologous end joining	mutations in RECQL4 cause Rothmund-Thomson syndrome, with alopecia, sparse eyebrows and lashes, cataracts and osteoporosis
SIRT6	Base excision repair, Nucleotide excision repair, Homologous recombination, Non-homologous end joining	SIRT6-deficient mice develop profound lymphopenia, loss of subcutaneous fat and lordokyphosis, and these defects overlap with aging-associated degenerative processes
SIRT7	Non-homologous end joining	mice defective in SIRT7 show phenotypic and molecular signs of accelerated aging such as premature pronounced curvature of the spine, reduced life span, and reduced non-homologous end joining
Werner syndrome helicase	Homologous recombination, Non-homologous end joining,Base excision repair, Replication arrest recovery	shorter lifespan, earlier onset of aging related pathologies, genome instability
ZMPSTE24	Homologous recombination	lack of Zmpste24 prevents lamin A formation and causes progeroid phenotypes in mice and humans, increased DNA damage and chromosome aberrations, sensitivity to DNA-damaging agents and deficiency in homologous recombination

=== DNA repair defects distinguished from "accelerated aging" ===
Most of the DNA repair deficiency diseases show varying degrees of "accelerated aging" or cancer (often some of both). But elimination of any gene essential for base excision repair kills the embryo—it is too lethal to display symptoms (much less symptoms of cancer or "accelerated aging"). Rothmund-Thomson syndrome and xeroderma pigmentosum display symptoms dominated by vulnerability to cancer, whereas progeria and Werner syndrome show the most features of "accelerated aging". Hereditary nonpolyposis colorectal cancer (HNPCC) is very often caused by a defective MSH2 gene leading to defective mismatch repair, but displays no symptoms of "accelerated aging". On the other hand, Cockayne Syndrome and trichothiodystrophy show mainly features of accelerated aging, but apparently without an increased risk of cancer Some DNA repair defects manifest as neurodegeneration rather than as cancer or "accelerated aging". (Also see the "DNA damage theory of aging" for a discussion of the evidence that DNA damage is the primary underlying cause of aging.)

=== Debate concerning "accelerated aging" ===
Some biogerontologists question that such a thing as "accelerated aging" actually exists, at least partly on the grounds that all of the so-called accelerated aging diseases are segmental progerias. Many disease conditions such as diabetes, high blood pressure, etc., are associated with increased mortality. Without reliable biomarkers of aging it is hard to support the claim that a disease condition represents more than accelerated mortality.

Against this position other biogerontologists argue that premature aging phenotypes are identifiable symptoms associated with mechanisms of molecular damage. The fact that these phenotypes are widely recognized justifies classification of the relevant diseases as "accelerated aging". Such conditions, it is argued, are readily distinguishable from genetic diseases associated with increased mortality, but not associated with an aging phenotype, such as cystic fibrosis and sickle cell anemia. It is further argued that segmental aging phenotype is a natural part of aging insofar as genetic variation leads to some people being more disposed than others to aging-associated diseases such as cancer and Alzheimer's disease.

== DNA repair defects and increased cancer risk ==
Individuals with an inherited impairment in DNA repair capability are often at increased risk of cancer. When a mutation is present in a DNA repair gene, the repair gene will either not be expressed or be expressed in an altered form. Then the repair function will likely be deficient, and, as a consequence, damages will tend to accumulate. Such DNA damages can cause errors during DNA synthesis leading to mutations, some of which may give rise to cancer. Germ-line DNA repair mutations that increase the risk of cancer are listed in the Table.

Inherited DNA repair gene mutations that increase cancer risk
DNA repair gene	Protein	Repair pathways affected	Cancers with increased risk
breast cancer 1 & 2	BRCA1 BRCA2	HRR of double strand breaks and daughter strand gaps	breast, ovarian
ataxia telangiectasia mutated	ATM	Different mutations in ATM reduce HRR, SSA or NHEJ	leukemia, lymphoma, breast
Nijmegen breakage syndrome	NBS (NBN)	NHEJ	lymphoid cancers
MRE11A	MRE11	HRR and NHEJ	breast
Bloom syndrome	BLM (helicase)	HRR	leukemia, lymphoma, colon, breast, skin, lung, auditory canal, tongue, esophagus, stomach, tonsil, larynx, uterus
WRN	WRN	HRR, NHEJ, long patch BER	soft tissue sarcoma, colorectal, skin, thyroid, pancreas
RECQL4	RECQ4	Helicase likely active in HRR	basal cell carcinoma, squamous cell carcinoma, intraepidermal carcinoma
Fanconi anemia genes FANCA, B, C, D1, D2, E, F, G, I, J, L, M, N	FANCA etc.	HRR and TLS	leukemia, liver tumors, solid tumors many areas
XPC, XPE (DDB2)	XPC, XPE	Global genomic NER, repairs damage in both transcribed and untranscribed DNA	skin cancer (melanoma and non-melanoma)
XPA, XPB, XPD, XPF, XPG	XPA XPB XPD XPF XPG	Transcription coupled NER repairs the transcribed strands of transcriptionally active genes	skin cancer (melanoma and non-melanoma)
XPV (also called polymerase H)	XPV (POLH)	Translesion synthesis (TLS)	skin cancers (basal cell, squamous cell, melanoma)
mutS (E. coli) homolog 2, mutS (E. coli) homolog 6, mutL (E. coli) homolog 1, postmeiotic segregation increased 2 (S. cerevisiae)	MSH2 MSH6 MLH1 PMS2	MMR	colorectal, endometrial
mutY homolog (E. coli)	MUTYH	BER of A paired with 8-oxo-dG	colon
TP53	P53	Direct role in HRR, BER, NER and acts in DNA damage response for those pathways and for NHEJ and MMR	sarcomas, breast cancers, brain tumors, and adrenocortical carcinomas
NTHL1	NTHL1	BER for Tg, FapyG, 5-hC, 5-hU in dsDNA	Colon cancer, endometrial cancer, duodenal cancer, basal-cell carcinoma

== See also ==
- Biogerontology
- Degenerative disease
- DNA damage theory of aging
- Genetic disorder
- Senescence
