= Mcr1 =

MCR1 is a gene found in yeast. It is used to understand cell cycle checkpoints. Researchers are working to find a way to use this gene to create anti-cancer drugs.

== Function ==
The most common function is found during the cell cycle when mutations occur because it becomes activated without phosphorylation and turns on Cds1. It also works with Cdk1 to get rid of the mutations that occur. If MCR 1 is not present in the cell these check points do not work properly.
