= CHEK2 =

Protein-coding gene in humans

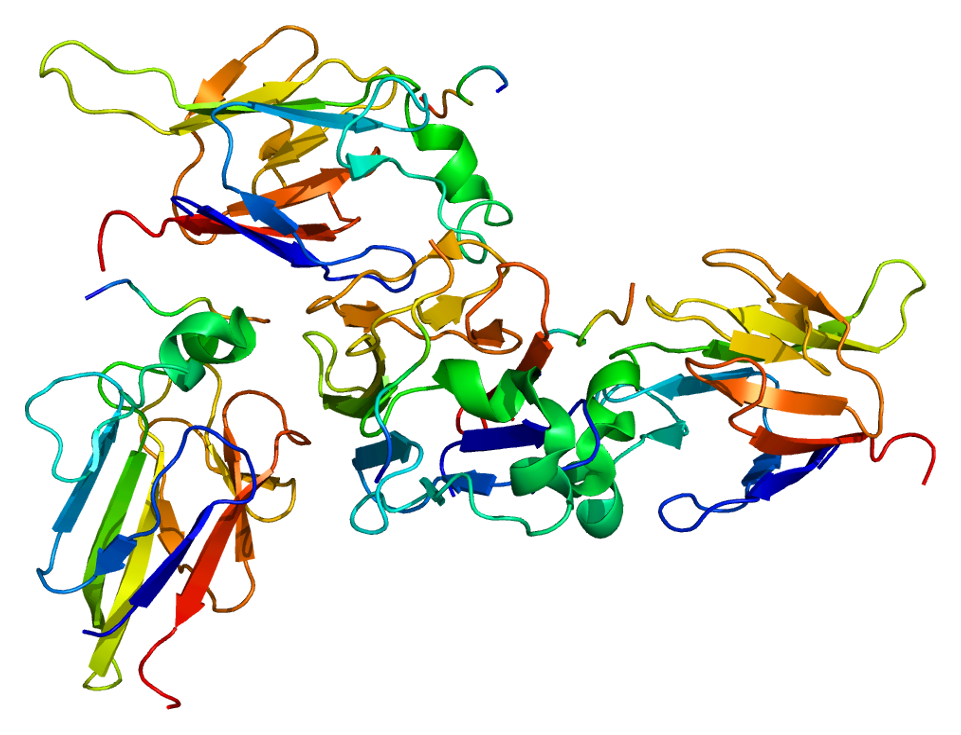
Available structures
PDB	Ortholog search: PDBe RCSB
PDB	List of PDB id codes 1GXC, 2CN5, 2CN8, 2W0J, 2W7X, 2WTC, 2WTD, 2XBJ, 2XM8, 2XM9, 2YCF, 2YCQ, 2YCR, 2YCS, 2YIQ, 2YIR, 2YIT, 3I6U, 3I6W, 4A9R, 4A9S, 4A9T, 4A9U, 4BDA, 4BDB, 4BDC, 4BDD, 4BDE, 4BDF, 4BDG, 4BDH, 4BDI, 4BDJ, 4BDK, 2WTI, 2WTJ, 2XK9

Identifiers
- Aliases: CHEK2, CDS1, CHK2, HuCds1, LFS2, PP1425, RAD53, hCds1, checkpoint kinase 2
- External IDs: OMIM: 604373; MGI: 1355321; HomoloGene: 38289; GeneCards: CHEK2; OMA:CHEK2 - orthologs

Gene location (Human)
Chr.	Chromosome 22 (human)
Band	22q12.1	Start	28,687,743 bp
Band	22q12.1	End	28,742,422 bp

Gene location (Mouse)
Chr.	Chromosome 5 (mouse)
Band	5|5 F	Start	110,987,845 bp
Band	5|5 F	End	111,022,011 bp
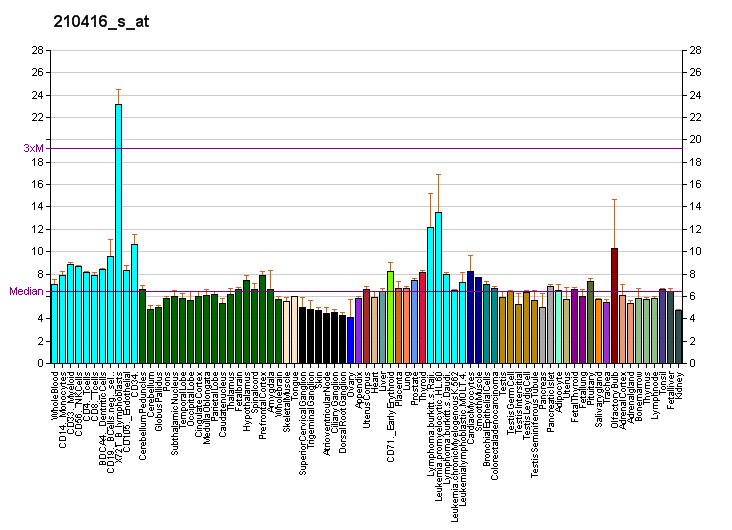
RNA expression pattern
Bgee	Human / Mouse (ortholog); Top expressed in: gonad; testicle; mucosa of transverse colon; tibial nerve; oocyte; secondary oocyte; rectum; ventricular zone; left ovary; right ovary / Top expressed in: morula; morula; fetal liver hematopoietic progenitor cell; epiblast; Ileal epithelium; blastocyst; embryo; Paneth cell; primitive streak; thymus; More reference expression data
BioGPS	More reference expression data
Gene ontology
Molecular function	transferase activity; nucleotide binding; protein kinase activity; protein homodimerization activity; metal ion binding; protein serine/threonine kinase activity; protein binding; identical protein binding; protein kinase binding; ATP binding; ubiquitin protein ligase binding; kinase activity
Cellular component	PML body; Golgi apparatus; nucleoplasm; telomere; nucleus; cytoplasm
Biological process	positive regulation of protein phosphorylation; regulation of transcription, DNA-templated; cellular response to bisphenol A; negative regulation of DNA damage checkpoint; phosphorylation; signal transduction in response to DNA damage; replicative senescence; DNA damage checkpoint signaling; protein stabilization; transcription, DNA-templated; cellular response to DNA damage stimulus; cell division; positive regulation of transcription, DNA-templated; protein phosphorylation; mitotic spindle assembly; G2/M transition of mitotic cell cycle; intrinsic apoptotic signaling pathway in response to DNA damage; DNA damage induced protein phosphorylation; regulation of protein catabolic process; protein autophosphorylation; cell cycle; positive regulation of anoikis; response to gamma radiation; apoptotic process; double-strand break repair; DNA repair; DNA damage response, signal transduction by p53 class mediator resulting in cell cycle arrest; regulation of signal transduction by p53 class mediator; DNA damage response, signal transduction by p53 class mediator resulting in transcription of p21 class mediator; peptidyl-serine phosphorylation; peptidyl-threonine phosphorylation; intrinsic apoptotic signaling pathway in response to DNA damage by p53 class mediator; regulation of apoptotic process; cellular response to gamma radiation; response to glycoside; mitotic DNA damage checkpoint signaling
Sources:Amigo / QuickGO
Orthologs
Species	Human	Mouse
Entrez	11200	50883
Ensembl	ENSG00000183765	ENSMUSG00000029521
UniProt	O96017	Q9Z265
RefSeq (mRNA)	NM_001005735; NM_001257387; NM_007194; NM_145862; NM_001349956	NM_016681; NM_001363308
RefSeq (protein)	NP_001005735; NP_001244316; NP_009125; NP_665861; NP_001336885	NP_057890; NP_001350237
Location (UCSC)	Chr 22: 28.69 – 28.74 Mb	Chr 5: 110.99 – 111.02 Mb
PubMed search
- Wikidata
View/Edit Human	View/Edit Mouse

CHEK2 (Checkpoint kinase 2) is a tumor suppressor gene that encodes the protein CHK2, a serine-threonine kinase. CHK2 is involved in DNA repair, cell cycle arrest or apoptosis in response to DNA damage. Mutations to the CHEK2 gene have been linked to a wide range of cancers.

== Gene location ==
The CHEK2 gene is located on the long (q) arm of chromosome 22 at position 12.1. Its location on chromosome 22 stretches from base pair 28,687,742 to base pair 28,741,904.

== Protein structure ==
The CHEK2 protein encoded by the CHEK2 gene is a serine threonine kinase. The protein consists of 543 amino acids and the following domains:

- N-terminal SQ/TQ cluster domain (SCD)
- Central forkhead-associated (FHA) domain
- C-terminal serine/threonine kinase domain (KD)

The SCD domain contains multiple SQ/TQ motifs that serve as sites for phosphorylation in response to DNA damage. The most notable and frequently phosphorylated site being Thr68.

CHK2 appears as a monomer in its inactive state. However, in the event of DNA damage SCD phosphorylation causes CHK2 dimerization. The phosphorylated Thr68 (located on the SCD) interacts with the FHA domain to form the dimer. After the protein dimerizes the KD is activated via autophosphorylation. Once the KD is activated the CHK2 dimer dissociates.

== Function and mechanism ==
The CHEK2 gene encodes for checkpoint kinase 2 (CHK2), a protein that acts as a tumor suppressor. CHK2 regulates cell division, and has the ability to prevent cells from dividing too rapidly or in an uncontrolled manner.

When DNA undergoes a double-strand break, CHK2 is activated. Specifically, DNA damage-activated phosphatidylinositol kinase family protein (PIKK) ATM phosphorylates site Thr68 and activates CHK2. Once activated, CHK2 phosphorylates downstream targets including CDC25 phosphatases, responsible for dephosphorylating and activating the cyclin-dependent kinases (CDKs). Thus, CHK2's inhibition of the CDC25 phosphatases prevents entry of the cell into mitosis. Furthermore, the CHK2 protein interacts with several other proteins including p53 (p53). Stabilization of p53 by CHK2 leads to cell cycle arrest in phase G1. Furthermore, CHK2 is known to phosphorylate the cell-cycle transcription factor E2F1 and the promyelocytic leukemia protein (PML) involved in apoptosis (programmed cell death).

== Association with cancer ==
The CHK2 protein plays a critical role in the DNA damage checkpoint. Thus, mutations to the CHEK2 gene have been labeled as causes to a wide range of cancers.

In 1999, genetic variations of CHEK2 were found to correspond to inherited cancer susceptibility.

Bell et al. (1999) discovered three CHEK2 germline mutations among four Li–Fraumeni syndrome (LFS) and 18 Li–Fraumeni-like (LFL) families. Since the time of this discovery, two of the three variants (a deletion in the kinase domain in exon 10 and a missense mutation in the FHA domain in exon 3) have been linked to inherited susceptibility to breast as well as other cancers.

Beyond initial speculations, screening of LFS and LFL patients has revealed no or very rare individual missense variants in the CHEK2 gene. Additionally, the deletion in the kinase domain on exon 10 has been found rare among LFS/LFL patients. The evidence from these studies has suggests that CHEK2 is not a predisposition gene to Li–Fraumeni syndrome.

=== Breast cancer ===
Inherited mutations in the CHEK2 gene have been linked to certain cases of breast cancer. Most notably, the deletion of a single DNA nucleotide at position 1100 in exon 10 (1100delC) produces a nonfunctional version of the CHK2 protein, truncated at the kinase domain. The loss of normal CHK2 protein function leads to unregulated cell division, accumulated damage to DNA and in many cases, tumor development. The CHEK2*1100del mutation is most commonly seen in individuals of Eastern and Northern European descent. Within these populations the CHEK2*1100delC mutation is seen in 1 out of 100 to 1 out of 200 individuals. However, in North America the frequency drops to 1 out of 333 to 1 out of 500. The mutation is almost absent in Spain and India. Studies show that a CHEK2 1100delC corresponds to a two-fold increased risk of breast cancer and a 10-fold increased risk of breast cancer in males.

A CHEK2 mutation known as the I157T variant to the FHA domain in exon 3 has also been linked to breast cancer but at a lower risk than the CHEK2*1100delC mutation. The estimated fraction of breast cancer attributed to this variant is reported to be around 1.2% in the US.

Two more CHEK2 gene mutations, CHEK2*S428F, an amino-acid substitution to the kinase domain in exon 11 and CHEK2*P85L, an amino-acid substitution in the N-terminal region (exon 1) have been found in the Ashkenazi Jewish population. Suggestion of a Hispanic founder mutation has also been described.

=== Other cancers ===
Mutations to CHEK2 have been found in hereditary and nonhereditary cases of cancer. Studies link the mutation to cases of prostate, lung, colon, kidney, and thyroid cancers. Links have also been drawn to certain brain tumors and osteosarcoma.

Unlike BRCA1 and BRCA2 mutations, CHEK2 mutations do not appear to cause an elevated risk for ovarian cancer. However, a large-effect genome-wide association for squamous lung cancer has been described for a rare variant in CHEK2 (p.Ile157Thr, rs17879961, OR = 0.38).

== Meiosis ==
CHEK2 regulates cell cycle progression and spindle assembly during mouse oocyte maturation and early embryo development. Although CHEK2 is a down stream effector of the ATM kinase that responds primarily to double-strand breaks it can also be activated by ATR (ataxia-telangiectasia and Rad3 related) kinase that responds primarily to single-strand breaks. In mice, CHEK2 is essential for DNA damage surveillance in female meiosis. The response of oocytes to DNA double-strand break damage involves a pathway hierarchy in which ATR kinase signals to CHEK2 which then activates p53 and p63 proteins.

In the fruit fly Drosophila, irradiation of germ line cells generates double-strand breaks that result in cell cycle arrest and apoptosis. The Drosophila CHEK2 ortholog mnk and the p53 ortholog dp53 are required for much of the cell death observed in early oogenesis when oocyte selection and meiotic recombination occur.

== Interactions ==
CHEK2 has been shown to interact with:

- BRCA1
- GINS2
- MDC1
- MSH2
- MUS81
- PLK1
- PLK3
