= SAE2 =

Sae2 or SAE2 may refer to:

- SAE2, a yeast gene and its protein product Sae2
- SUMO-activating enzyme subunit 2 (SAE2), the protein product of the human gene UBA2
