= MRX =

MRX may refer to:

- The ABCG2 gene
- MRX complex, DNA damage repair complex in yeast
- The Magnetic Reconnection eXperiment led by DoE's Princeton Plasma Physics Laboratory
- Mahshahr Airport, Iran, by IATA airport code
- Philips HeartStart MRx cardiac monitor/defibrillator
- Proposed pressurized water reactor for ship propulsion developed by the Japan Atomic Energy Research Institute (JAERI)
- Hashtag for Market research
