= AZD-1390 =

Chemical compound

Legal status
- Legal status: Investigational

Identifiers
- IUPAC name: 7-Fluoro-3-methyl-8-[6-(3-piperidin-1-ylpropoxy)pyridin-3-yl]-1-propan-2-ylimidazo[4,5-c]quinolin-2-one
- CAS Number: 2089288-03-7
- PubChem CID: 126689157
- IUPHAR/BPS: 11277
- ChemSpider: 67886355
- UNII: CI43QFE22O
- ChEMBL: ChEMBL4594429

Chemical and physical data
- Formula: C_{27}H_{32}FN_{5}O_{2}
- Molar mass: 477.584 g·mol^{−1}
- 3D model (JSmol): Interactive image
- SMILES: CC(C)N1C2=C(C=NC3=CC(=C(C=C32)C4=CN=C(C=C4)OCCCN5CCCCC5)F)N(C1=O)C
- InChI: InChI=1S/C27H32FN5O2/c1-18(2)33-26-21-14-20(22(28)15-23(21)29-17-24(26)31(3)27(33)34)19-8-9-25(30-16-19)35-13-7-12-32-10-5-4-6-11-32/h8-9,14-18H,4-7,10-13H2,1-3H3; Key:VQSZIPCGAGVRRP-UHFFFAOYSA-N

AZD-1390 is an experimental anticancer drug developed by AstraZeneca that inhibits ataxia telangiectasia mutated (ATM).
