= MRN complex-interacting protein =

Protein-coding gene in the species Homo sapiens

MRNIP

Identifiers
- Aliases: MRNIP, C5orf45, MRN complex interacting protein
- External IDs: OMIM: 617154; MGI: 1915317; GeneCards: MRNIP

Gene location (Human)
Chr.	Chromosome 5 (human)
Band	5q35.3	Start	179,835,133 bp
Band	5q35.3	End	179,862,173 bp

Gene location (Mouse)
Chr.	Chromosome 11 (mouse)
Band	11|11 B1.3	Start	50,065,271 bp
Band	11|11 B1.3	End	50,090,942 bp
RNA expression pattern
Bgee	Human / Mouse (ortholog); Top expressed in: cerebellar hemisphere; right hemisphere of cerebellum; right uterine tube; pituitary gland; anterior pituitary; left ovary; left lobe of thyroid gland; right lobe of thyroid gland; canal of the cervix; right ovary / Top expressed in: blastocyst; zygote; secondary oocyte; primary oocyte; genital tubercle; right kidney; proximal tubule; spermatocyte; yolk sac; morula; More reference expression data
BioGPS	n/a
Gene ontology
Molecular function	chromatin binding; protein binding
Cellular component	nucleus; nucleoplasm; Mre11 complex
Biological process	DNA repair; cellular response to DNA damage stimulus; mitotic G2 DNA damage checkpoint signaling; response to ionizing radiation; positive regulation of protein kinase activity; protein localization to chromatin; positive regulation of double-strand break repair via homologous recombination; regulation of double-strand break repair via nonhomologous end joining
Sources:Amigo / QuickGO
Orthologs
Databases	NCBI: entry; OMA: entry
Species	Human	Mouse
Entrez	51149	68067
Ensembl	ENSG00000161010; ENSG00000283918	ENSMUSG00000020381
UniProt	Q6NTE8	Q9D1F5
RefSeq (mRNA)	NM_016175; NM_001017987; NM_001018061; NM_001018062	NM_026543
RefSeq (protein)	NP_001017987; NP_057259	NP_080819
Location (UCSC)	Chr 5: 179.84 – 179.86 Mb	Chr 11: 50.07 – 50.09 Mb
PubMed search
- Wikidata
View/Edit Human	View/Edit Mouse

MRN complex-interacting protein is a protein that in humans is encoded by the MRNIP gene (previously C5orf45). The MRNIP protein is involved with DNA repair through its interaction with the MRN complex.
