= MRX complex =

The MRX complex is a heterotrimeric protein complex consisting of Mre11, Rad50, and Xrs2. It is a budding yeast homolog of the mammalian Mre11-Rad50-Nbs1 (MRN) DNA damage repair complex.

== Double-strand break repair ==
Cells are able to accurately repair DNA double-strand breaks using a process called homologous recombination. By this process DNA sequence information that is lost because of the breakage can be recovered from a second homologous DNA molecule. Homologous recombinational repair is important for removing DNA damage both during mitosis and meiosis. The repair process begins with the degradation of the 5’ end on either side of the double-strand break to yield 3’ single-stranded DNA tails (a process called end resection). Next the Rad51 protein binds to these tails and initiates a process of strand invasion leading to recovery of genetic information from the undamaged homologous sequence of the second DNA molecule. Studies with the yeast Saccharomyces cerevisiae have shown that end resection is catalyzed by the MRX protein complex. The MRE11 enzyme (one of the three component proteins of the MRX complex) first makes a nick in the DNA at 15 to 20 nucleotides from the 5’ end of the break. This creates an entry point for further processing by exonucleases to complete the initial resection stage of the overall process.
