= Nijmegen breakage syndrome =

- Other names: Berlin breakage syndrome, Ataxia telangiectasia variant 1 and Seemanova syndrome,
- Nijmegen breakage syndrome has an autosomal recessive pattern of inheritance.
- Specialty: Endocrinology

Nijmegen breakage syndrome (NBS) is a rare autosomal recessive congenital disorder causing chromosomal instability, probably as a result of a defect in the double Holliday junction DNA repair mechanism and/or the synthesis dependent strand annealing mechanism for repairing double strand breaks in DNA (see Homologous recombination).

NBS1 codes for a protein (nibrin) that has two major functions: (1) to stop the cell cycle in the S phase, when there are errors in the cell DNA (2) to interact with FANCD2 that can activate the BRCA1/BRCA2 pathway of DNA repair. This explains why mutations in the NBS1 gene lead to higher levels of cancer (see Fanconi anemia, Cockayne syndrome).

The name derives from the Dutch city Nijmegen, where the condition was first described.

Most people with NBS have West Slavic origins. The largest number of them live in Poland.

== Presentation ==
It is characterized by microcephaly, a distinct facial appearance, short stature, immunodeficiency, radiation sensitivity and a strong predisposition to lymphoid malignancy. NBS is caused by a mutation in the NBS1 gene. Unsurprisingly, many of the features are similar to ataxia telangiectasia (AT) and this syndrome was sometimes termed AT-variant 1, as the protein mutated in AT, ATM, interacts with the MRE11/RAD50/NBS1 (MRN) complex. Other syndromes with clinical features similar to Nijmegen Breakage Syndrome include RAD50 deficiency and Cernunnos/NHEJ deficiency.

== Cause ==
NBS is caused by a mutation in the NBS1 gene, located at human chromosome 8q21. The disease is inherited in an autosomal recessive manner. This means the defective gene responsible for the disorder is located on an autosome (chromosome 8 is an autosome), and two copies of the defective gene (one inherited from each parent) are required in order to be born with the disorder. The parents of an individual with an autosomal recessive disorder both carry one copy of the defective gene, but usually do not experience any signs or symptoms of the disorder.

Two adult siblings, both heterozygous for two particular NBS1 nonsense mutations displayed cellular sensitivity to radiation, chromosome instability and fertility defects, but not the developmental defects that are typically found in other NBS patients. These individuals appear to be primarily defective in homologous recombination, a process that accurately repairs double-strand breaks, both in somatic cells and during meiosis.

== Treatment ==
There is no treatment for NBS; however, in those with agammaglobulinemia, intravenous immunoglobulin may be started. Prophylactic antibiotics are considered to prevent urinary tract infections as those with NBS often have congenital kidney malformations. In the treatment of malignancies, radiation therapy, alkylating antineoplastic agents, and epipodophyllotoxins are not used, and methotrexate can be used only with caution; the dose should be limited. Bone marrow transplants and hematopoietic stem cell transplants are also considered in the treatment of NBS. The supplementation of vitamin E is also recommended. A ventriculoperitoneal shunt can be placed in patients with hydrocephalus, and surgical intervention for congenital deformities is also attempted.

== Prognosis ==
A review from 2000 stated that life expectancy was reduced because of a tendency to develop cancer relatively early as well as deaths due to infections related to immunodeficiency.
