= Phosphatidylinositol 3-kinase-related kinase =

Protein family

Phosphatidylinositol 3-kinase-related kinases (PIKKs) are a family of Ser/Thr-protein kinases with sequence similarity to phosphatidylinositol-3 kinases (PI3Ks).

== Members ==
The human PIKK family includes six members:

Gene	Protein	Function
ATM	ataxia-telangiectasia mutated	response to DNA damage
ATR	ataxia- and Rad3-related	"
PRKDC	DNA-dependent protein kinase catalytic subunit (DNA-PKcs)	"
MTOR	mammalian target of rapamycin (mTOR)	nutrient-regulated kinase that controls metabolism and cell growth
SMG1	suppressor of morphogenesis in genitalia	regulates nonsense-mediated mRNA decay
TRRAP	transformation/transcription domain-associated protein	transcription factor co-activator

== Structure ==
PIKKs proteins contain the following four domains:

1. N-terminus FRAP-ATM- TRRAP (FAT) domain, Pfam PF02259
2. kinase domain (KD; PI3_PI4_kinase),
3. PIKK- regulatory domain (PRD), and
4. C-terminus FAT-C-terminal (FATC) domain Pfam PF02260
