= ATM serine/threonine kinase =

Mammalian protein found in Homo sapiens

ATM
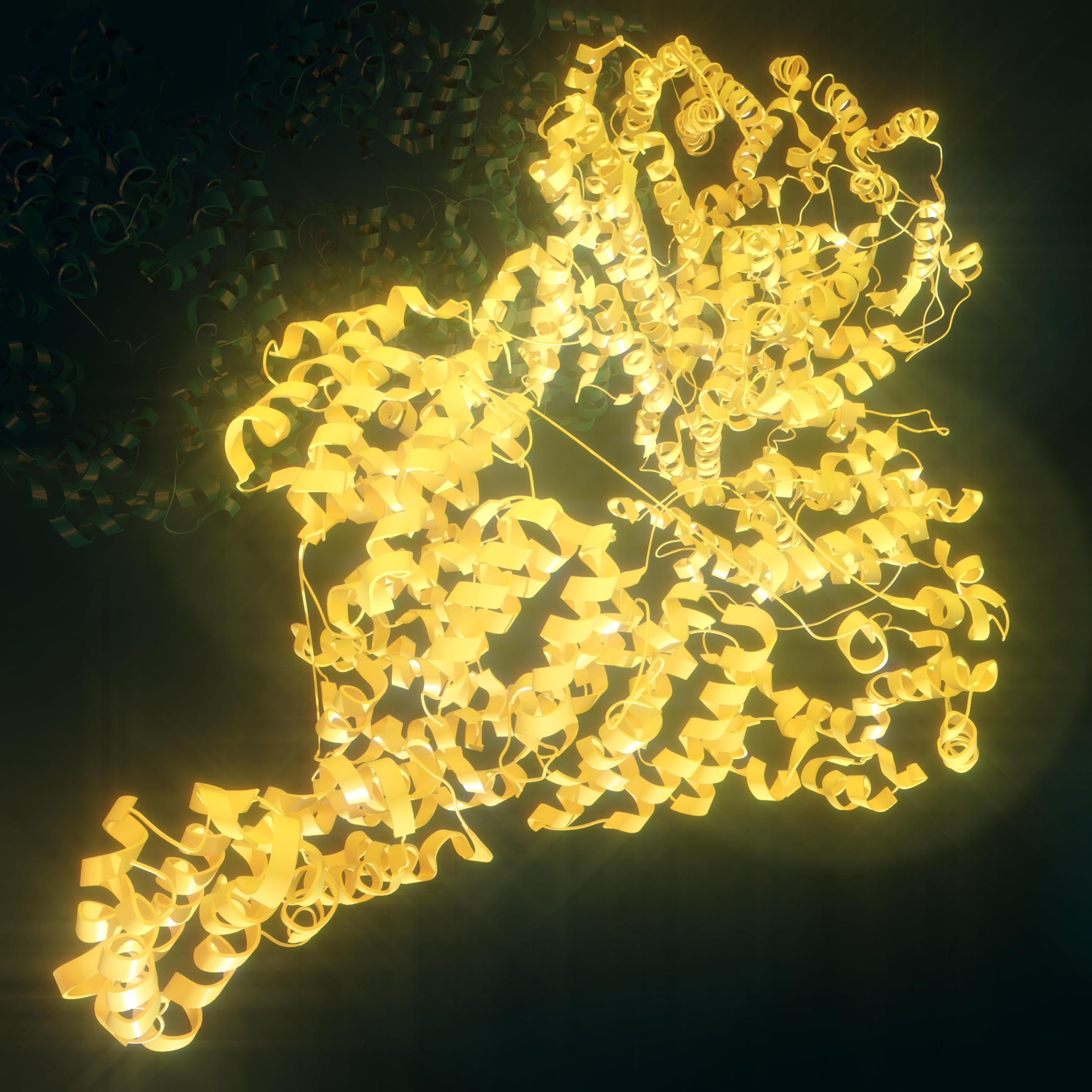

Identifiers
- Aliases: ATM, ATM serine/threonine kinase, AT1, ATA, ATC, ATD, ATDC, ATE, TEL1, TELO1, ataxia-telangiectasia mutated
- External IDs: OMIM: 607585; MGI: 107202; GeneCards: ATM
Enzyme activity
EC #	BRENDA	ExPASy	KEGG	MetaCyc
2.7.11.1	↗	↗	↗	↗

Gene location (Human)
Chr.	Chromosome 11 (human)
Band	11q22.3	Start	108,223,044 bp
Band	11q22.3	End	108,369,102 bp

Gene location (Mouse)
Chr.	Chromosome 9 (mouse)
Band	9 A5.3|9 29.12 cM	Start	53,350,449 bp
Band	9 A5.3|9 29.12 cM	End	53,448,040 bp
RNA expression pattern
Bgee	Human / Mouse (ortholog); Top expressed in: Achilles tendon; epithelium of colon; corpus callosum; lymph node; bone marrow cell; body of pancreas; sural nerve; tonsil; superficial temporal artery; ventricular zone / Top expressed in: parotid gland; tail of embryo; lacrimal gland; ventricular zone; morula; epiblast; maxillary prominence; vas deferens; ganglionic eminence; epithelium of stomach; More reference expression data
BioGPS	n/a
Gene ontology
Molecular function	transferase activity; DNA binding; nucleotide binding; protein kinase activity; DNA-dependent protein kinase activity; protein dimerization activity; protein N-terminus binding; 1-phosphatidylinositol-3-kinase activity; kinase activity; protein serine/threonine kinase activity; protein binding; ATP binding; protein-containing complex binding
Cellular component	cytoplasm; DNA repair complex; spindle; nucleoplasm; telomere; cytoplasmic vesicle; nucleus; nucleolus
Biological process	somitogenesis; response to ionizing radiation; neuron apoptotic process; reciprocal meiotic recombination; DNA damage response, signal transduction by p53 class mediator resulting in cell cycle arrest; response to hypoxia; female gamete generation; determination of adult lifespan; phosphorylation; establishment of protein-containing complex localization to telomere; meiotic telomere clustering; peptidyl-serine autophosphorylation; DNA damage checkpoint signaling; regulation of telomerase activity; positive regulation of telomerase catalytic core complex assembly; positive regulation of telomere maintenance via telomerase; positive regulation of neuron death; mitotic spindle assembly checkpoint signaling; oocyte development; lipoprotein catabolic process; regulation of cell cycle; protein phosphorylation; development of the heart; brain development; positive regulation of neuron apoptotic process; negative regulation of telomere capping; positive regulation of telomere maintenance via telomere lengthening; peptidyl-serine phosphorylation; cellular response to gamma radiation; intrinsic apoptotic signaling pathway in response to DNA damage; V(D)J recombination; positive regulation of apoptotic process; regulation of cellular response to heat; pre-B cell allelic exclusion; cell cycle; histone mRNA catabolic process; cellular response to nitrosative stress; positive regulation of DNA damage response, signal transduction by p53 class mediator; double-strand break repair via nonhomologous end joining; negative regulation of B cell proliferation; signal transduction; establishment of RNA localization to telomere; apoptotic process; DNA replication; DNA double-strand break processing; regulation of signal transduction by p53 class mediator; regulation of autophagy; phosphatidylinositol-3-phosphate biosynthetic process; cellular response to X-ray; double-strand break repair via homologous recombination; regulation of apoptotic process; negative regulation of TORC1 signaling; ovarian follicle development; immune system process; immunoglobulin production; DNA damage induced protein phosphorylation; male meiotic nuclear division; female meiotic nuclear division; female gonad development; post-embryonic development; multicellular organism growth; protein autophosphorylation; thymus development; chromosome organization involved in meiotic cell cycle; DNA repair; cellular response to DNA damage stimulus; regulation of telomere maintenance via telomerase; positive regulation of DNA catabolic process; regulation of microglial cell activation; regulation of cellular response to gamma radiation; positive regulation of response to DNA damage stimulus; telomere maintenance; replicative senescence; positive regulation of gene expression; positive regulation of cell migration; positive regulation of cell adhesion; positive regulation of transcription by RNA polymerase II; cellular response to retinoic acid
Sources:Amigo / QuickGO
Orthologs
Databases	NCBI: entry; OMA: entry
Species	Human	Mouse
Entrez	472	11920
Ensembl	ENSG00000149311	ENSMUSG00000034218
UniProt	Q13315	Q62388
RefSeq (mRNA)	NM_000051; NM_138292; NM_138293; NM_001351834; NM_001351835 NM_001351836	NM_007499
RefSeq (protein)	NP_000042; NP_001338763; NP_001338764; NP_001338765; NP_000042.3	NP_031525
Location (UCSC)	Chr 11: 108.22 – 108.37 Mb	Chr 9: 53.35 – 53.45 Mb
PubMed search
- Wikidata
View/Edit Human	View/Edit Mouse

ATM serine/threonine kinase or Ataxia-telangiectasia mutated, symbol ATM, is a serine/threonine protein kinase that is recruited and activated by DNA double-strand breaks (canonical pathway), oxidative stress, topoisomerase cleavage complexes, splicing intermediates, R-loops and in some cases by single-strand DNA breaks. It phosphorylates several key proteins that initiate activation of the DNA damage checkpoint, leading to cell cycle arrest, DNA repair or apoptosis. Several of these targets, including p53, CHK2, BRCA1, NBS1 and H2AX are tumor suppressors.

In 1995, the gene was discovered by Yosef Shiloh who named its product ATM since he found that its mutations are responsible for the disorder ataxia–telangiectasia. In 1998, the Shiloh and Kastan laboratories independently showed that ATM is a protein kinase whose activity is enhanced by DNA damage.

Throughout the cell cycle DNA is monitored for damage. Damages result from errors during replication, by-products of metabolism, general toxic drugs or ionizing radiation. The cell cycle has different DNA damage checkpoints, which inhibit the next or maintain the current cell cycle step. There are two main checkpoints, the G1/S and the G2/M, during the cell cycle, which preserve correct progression. ATM plays a role in cell cycle delay after DNA damage, especially after double-strand breaks (DSBs). ATM is recruited to sites of double strand breaks by DSB sensor proteins, such as the MRN complex. After being recruited, it phosphorylates NBS1, along other DSB repair proteins. These modified mediator proteins then amplify the DNA damage signal, and transduce the signals to downstream effectors such as CHK2 and p53.

== Structure ==
The ATM gene codes for a 350 kDa protein consisting of 3056 amino acids. ATM belongs to the superfamily of phosphatidylinositol 3-kinase-related kinases (PIKKs). The PIKK superfamily comprises six Ser/Thr-protein kinases that show a sequence similarity to phosphatidylinositol 3-kinases (PI3Ks). This protein kinase family includes ataxia telangiectasia and Rad3 related (ATR) (ATM- and RAD3-related), DNA-PKcs (DNA-dependent protein kinase catalytic subunit) and mTOR (mammalian target of rapamycin). Characteristic for ATM are five domains. These are from N-terminus to C-terminus the HEAT repeat domain, the FRAP-ATM-TRRAP (FAT) domain, the kinase domain (KD), the PIKK-regulatory domain (PRD) and the FAT-C-terminal (FATC) domain. The HEAT repeats directly bind to the C-terminus of NBS1. The FAT domain interacts with ATM's kinase domain to stabilize the C-terminus region of ATM itself. The KD domain resumes kinase activity, while the PRD and the FATC domain regulate it. The structure of ATM has been solved in several publications using cryo-EM. In the inactive form, the protein forms a homodimer. In the canonical pathway, ATM is activated by the MRN complex and autophosphorylation, forming active monomers capable of phosphorylating several hundred downstream targets. In the non-canonical pathway, e.g. through simulation by oxidative stress, the dimer can be activated by the formation of disulfide bonds. The entire N-terminal domain together with the FAT domain are adopt an α-helical structure, which was initially predicted by sequence analysis. This α-helical structure forms a tertiary structure, which has a curved, tubular shape present for example in the Huntingtin protein, which also contains HEAT repeats. FATC is the C-terminal domain with a length of about 30 amino acids. It is highly conserved and consists of an α-helix. . See the detailed description of ATM gene and related protein domains.

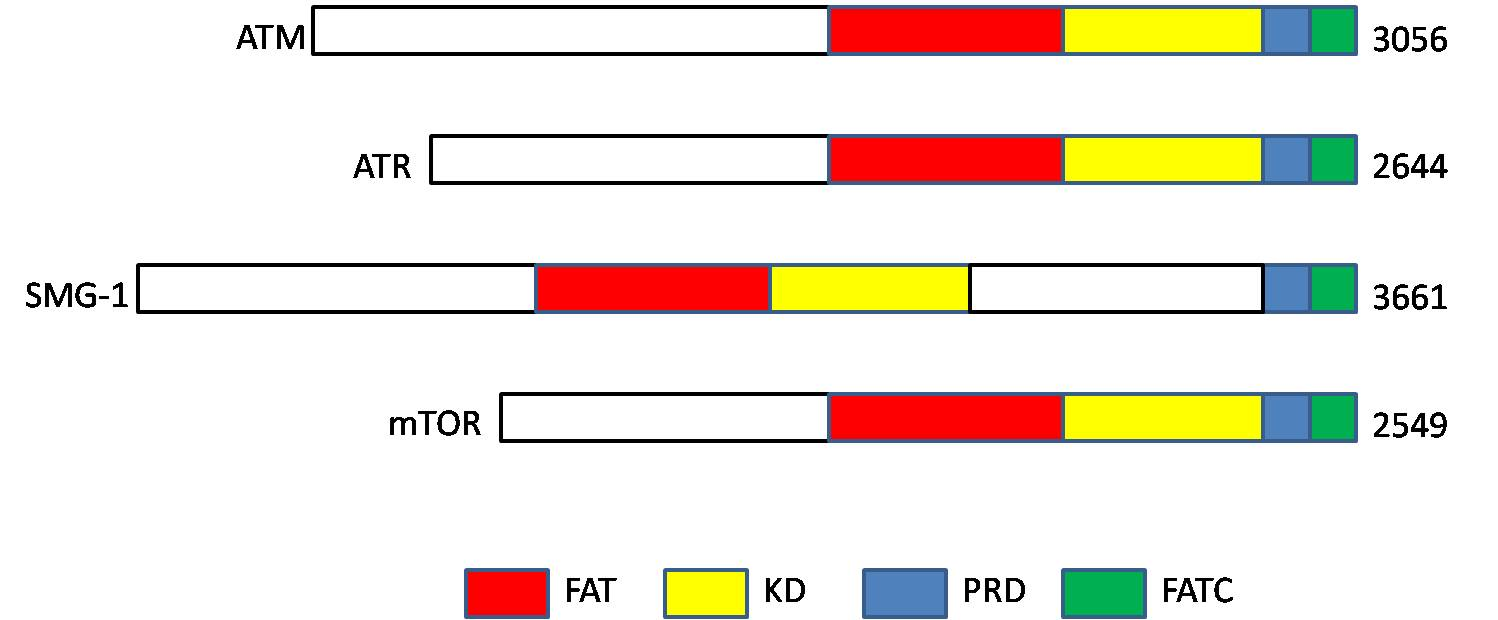
Schematic illustration of the four known conserved domains in four members of the PIKKs family

== Function ==
A complex of the three proteins MRE11, RAD50 and NBS1 (XRS2 in yeast), called the MRN complex in humans, recruits ATM to double strand breaks (DSBs) and holds the two ends together. ATM directly interacts with the NBS1 subunit and phosphorylates the histone variant H2AX on Ser139. This phosphorylation generates binding sites for adaptor proteins with a BRCT domain. These adaptor proteins then recruit different factors including the effector protein kinase CHK2 and the tumor suppressor p53. The ATM-mediated DNA damage response consists of a rapid and a delayed response. The effector kinase CHK2 is phosphorylated and thereby activated by ATM. Activated CHK2 phosphorylates phosphatase CDC25A, which is degraded thereupon and can no longer dephosphorylate CDK1-cyclin B, resulting in cell-cycle arrest. If the DSB can not be repaired during this rapid response, ATM additionally phosphorylates MDM2 and p53 at Ser15. p53 is also phosphorylated by the effector kinase CHK2. These phosphorylation events lead to stabilization and activation of p53 and subsequent transcription of numerous p53 target genes including CDK inhibitor p21 which lead to long-term cell-cycle arrest or even apoptosis.

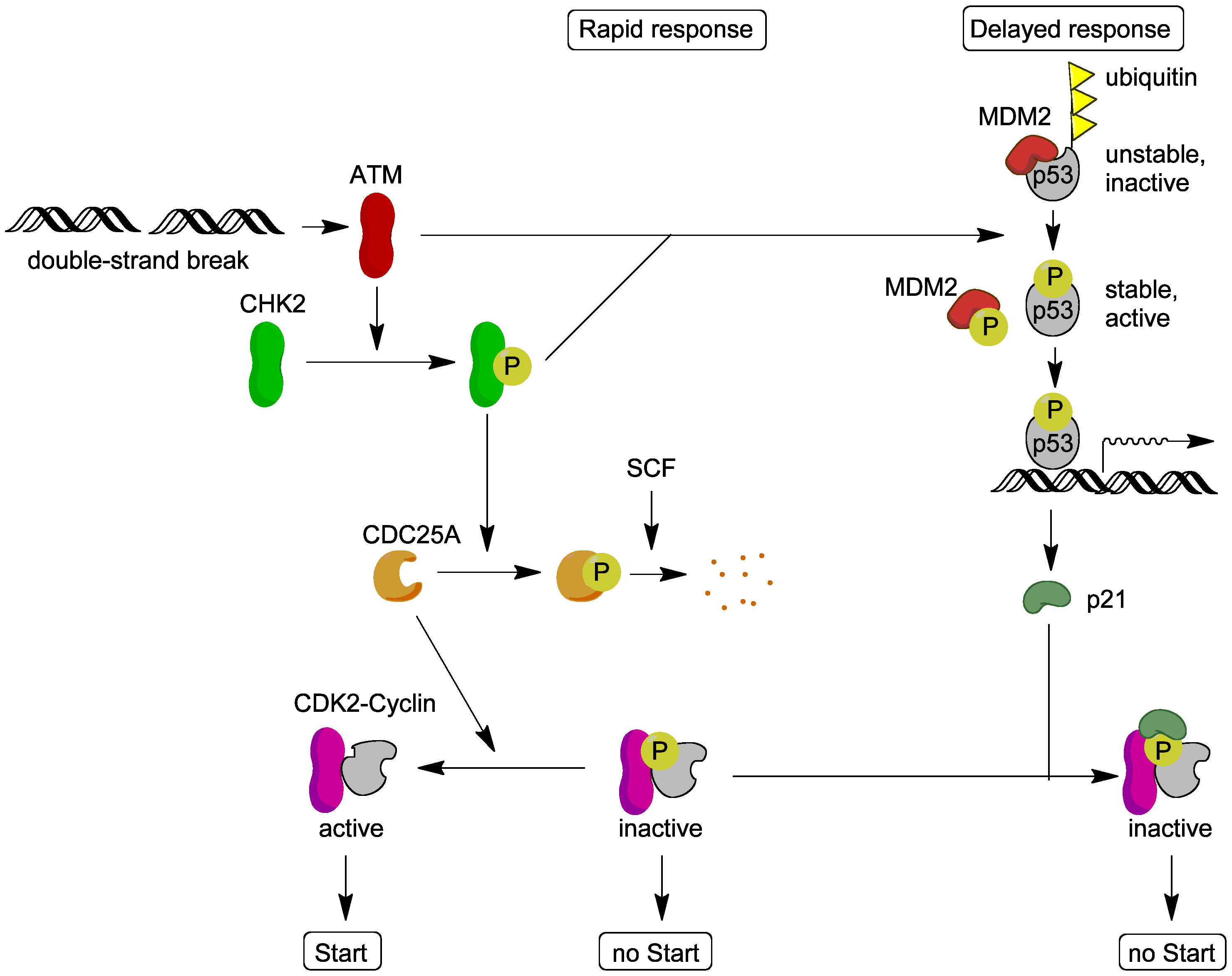
ATM-mediated two-step response to DNA double strand breaks. In the rapid response activated ATM phosphorylates effector kinase CHK2 which phosphorylates CDC25A, targeting it for ubiquitination and degradation. Therefore, phosphorylated CDK2-Cyclin accumulates and progression through the cell cycle is blocked. In the delayed response ATM phosphorylates the inhibitor of p53, MDM2, and p53, which is also phosphorylated by Chk2. The resulting activation and stabilization of p53 leads to an increased expression of Cdk inhibitor p21, which further helps to keep Cdk activity low and to maintain long-term cell cycle arrest.

The protein kinase ATM may also be involved in mitochondrial homeostasis, as a regulator of mitochondrial autophagy (mitophagy) whereby old, dysfunctional mitochondria are removed. Increased ATM activity also occurs in viral infection where ATM is activated early during dengue virus infection as part of autophagy induction and ER stress response.

== Regulation ==
A functional MRN complex is required for ATM activation after DSBs. The complex functions upstream of ATM in mammalian cells and induces conformational changes that facilitate an increase in the affinity of ATM towards its substrates, such as CHK2 and p53. Inactive ATM is present in the cells without DSBs as dimers or multimers. Upon DNA damage, ATM autophosphorylates on residue Ser1981. This phosphorylation provokes dissociation of ATM dimers, which is followed by the release of active ATM monomers. Further autophosphorylation (of residues Ser367 and Ser1893) is required for normal activity of the ATM kinase. Activation of ATM by the MRN complex is preceded by at least two steps, i.e. recruitment of ATM to DSB ends by the mediator of DNA damage checkpoint protein 1 (MDC1) which binds to MRE11, and the subsequent stimulation of kinase activity with the NBS1 C-terminus. The three domains FAT, PRD and FATC are all involved in regulating the activity of the KD kinase domain. The FAT domain interacts with ATM's KD domain to stabilize the C-terminus region of ATM itself. The FATC domain is critical for kinase activity and highly sensitive to mutagenesis. It mediates protein-protein interaction for example with the histone acetyltransferase TIP60 (HIV-1 Tat interacting protein 60 kDa), which acetylates ATM on residue Lys3016. The acetylation occurs in the C-terminal half of the PRD domain and is required for ATM kinase activation and for its conversion into monomers. While deletion of the entire PRD domain abolishes the kinase activity of ATM, specific small deletions show no effect.

== Germline mutations and cancer risk ==
People who carry a heterozygous ATM mutation have increased risk of mainly pancreatic cancer, prostate cancer, stomach cancer and invasive ductal carcinoma of the breast. Homozygous ATM mutation confers the disease ataxia–telangiectasia (AT), a rare human disease characterized by cerebellar degeneration, extreme cellular sensitivity to radiation and a predisposition to cancer. All AT patients contain mutations in the ATM gene. Most other AT-like disorders are defective in genes encoding the MRN protein complex. One feature of the ATM protein is its rapid increase in kinase activity immediately following double-strand break formation. The phenotypic manifestation of AT is due to the broad range of substrates for the ATM kinase, involving DNA repair, apoptosis, G_{1}/S, intra-S checkpoint and G_{2}/M checkpoints, gene regulation, translation initiation, and telomere maintenance. Therefore, a defect in ATM has severe consequences in repairing certain types of damage to DNA, and cancer may result from improper repair. AT patients have an increased risk for breast cancer that has been ascribed to ATM's interaction and phosphorylation of BRCA1 and its associated proteins following DNA damage.

== Somatic mutations in sporadic cancers ==
Mutations in the ATM gene are found at relatively low frequencies in sporadic cancers. According to COSMIC, the Catalogue Of Somatic Mutations In Cancer, the frequencies with which heterozygous mutations in ATM are found in common cancers include 0.7% in 713 ovarian cancers, 0.9% in central nervous system cancers, 1.9% in 1,120 breast cancers, 2.1% in 847 kidney cancers, 4.6% in colon cancers, 7.2% among 1,040 lung cancers and 11.1% in 1790 hematopoietic and lymphoid tissue cancers. Certain kinds of leukemias and lymphomas, including mantle cell lymphoma, T-ALL, atypical B cell chronic lymphocytic leukemia, and T-PLL are also associated with ATM defects. A comprehensive literature search on ATM deficiency in pancreatic cancer, that captured 5,234 patients, estimated that the total prevalence of germline or somatic ATM mutations in pancreatic cancer was 6.4%. ATM mutations may serve as predictive biomarkers of response for certain therapies, since preclinical studies have found that ATM deficiency can sensitise some cancer types to ATR inhibition.

== Frequent epigenetic deficiencies of ATM in cancers ==
ATM is one of the DNA repair genes frequently hypermethylated in its promoter region in various cancers (see table of such genes in Cancer epigenetics). The promoter methylation of ATM causes reduced protein or mRNA expression of ATM.

More than 73% of brain tumors were found to be methylated in the ATM gene promoter and there was strong inverse correlation between ATM promoter methylation and its protein expression (p < 0.001).

The ATM gene promoter was observed to be hypermethylated in 53% of small (impalpable) breast cancers and was hypermethylated in 78% of stage II or greater breast cancers with a highly significant correlation (P = 0.0006) between reduced ATM mRNA abundance and aberrant methylation of the ATM gene promoter.

In non-small cell lung cancer (NSCLC), the ATM promoter methylation status of paired tumors and surrounding histologically uninvolved lung tissue was found to be 69% and 59%, respectively. However, in more advanced NSCLC the frequency of ATM promoter methylation was lower at 22%. The finding of ATM promoter methylation in surrounding histologically uninvolved lung tissue suggests that ATM deficiency may be present early in a field defect leading to progression to NSCLC.

In squamous cell carcinoma of the head and neck, 42% of tumors displayed ATM promoter methylation.

DNA damage appears to be the primary underlying cause of cancer, and deficiencies in DNA repair likely underlie many forms of cancer. If DNA repair is deficient, DNA damage tends to accumulate. Such excess DNA damage may increase mutational errors during DNA replication due to error-prone translesion synthesis. Excess DNA damage may also increase epigenetic alterations due to errors during DNA repair. Such mutations and epigenetic alterations may give rise to cancer. The frequent epigenetic deficiency of ATM in a number of cancers likely contributed to the progression of those cancers.

== Meiosis ==
ATM functions during meiotic prophase. The wild-type ATM gene is expressed at a four-fold increased level in human testes compared to somatic cells (such as skin fibroblasts). In both mice and humans, ATM deficiency results in female and male infertility. Deficient ATM expression causes severe meiotic disruption during prophase I. In addition, impaired ATM-mediated DNA DSB repair has been identified as a likely cause of aging of mouse and human oocytes. Expression of the ATM gene, as well as other key DSB repair genes, declines with age in mouse and human oocytes and this decline is paralleled by an increase of DSBs in primordial follicles. These findings indicate that ATM-mediated homologous recombinational repair is a crucial function of meiosis.

== Inhibitors ==
Several ATM kinase inhibitors are currently known, some of which are already in clinical trials. One of the first discovered ATM inhibitors is caffeine with an IC_{50} of 0.2 mM and only a low selectivity within the PIKK family. Wortmannin is an irreversible inhibitor of ATM with no selectivity over other related PIKK and PI3K kinases. The most important group of inhibitors are compounds based on the 3-methyl-1,3-dihydro-2H-imidazo[4,5-c]quinolin-2-one scaffold. The first important representative is the inhibitor is dactolisib (NVP-BEZ235), which was first published by Novartis as a selective mTOR/PI3K inhibitor. It was later shown to also inhibit other PIKK kinases such as ATM, DNA-PK and ATR. Various optimisation efforts by AstraZeneca (AZD0156, AZD1390), Merck (M4076) and Dimitrov et al. have led to highly active ATM inhibitors with greater potency.

Caffeine is an ATM inhibitor with low activity

AZD0156 is a highly active ATM inhibitor from AstraZeneca

== Interactions ==
Ataxia telangiectasia mutated has been shown to interact with:

- Abl gene,
- BRCA1,
- Bloom syndrome protein,
- DNA-PKcs,
- FANCD2,
- MRE11A,
- Nibrin,
- P53,
- RAD17,
- RAD51,
- RBBP8,
- RHEB,
- RRM2B,
- SMC1A
- TERF1, and
- TP53BP1.

== Tefu ==
The Tefu protein of Drosophila melanogaster is a structural and functional homolog of the human ATM protein. Tefu, like ATM, is required for DNA repair and normal levels of meiotic recombination in oocytes.
