= Nibrin =

Protein-coding gene in the species Homo sapiens

NBN

Identifiers
- Aliases: NBN, AT-V1, AT-V2, ATV, NBS, NBS1, P95, nibrin
- External IDs: OMIM: 602667; MGI: 1351625; GeneCards: NBN

Gene location (Human)
Chr.	Chromosome 8 (human)
Band	8q21.3	Start	89,933,331 bp
Band	8q21.3	End	90,003,228 bp

Gene location (Mouse)
Chr.	Chromosome 4 (mouse)
Band	4|4 A2	Start	15,957,925 bp
Band	4|4 A2	End	15,992,589 bp
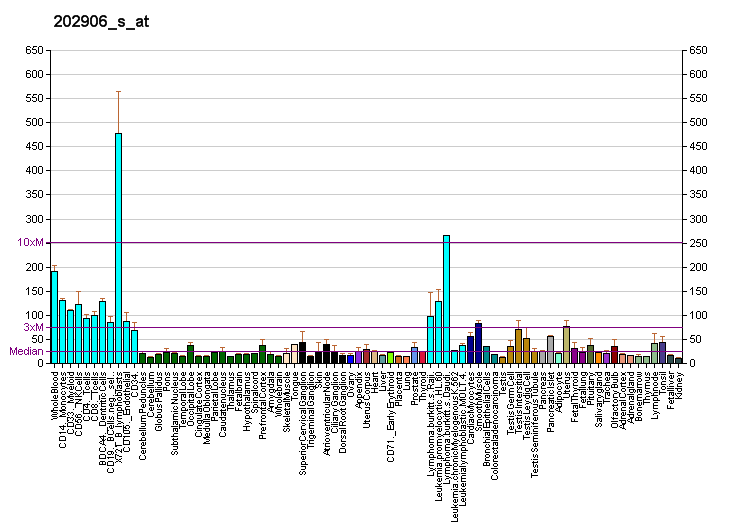

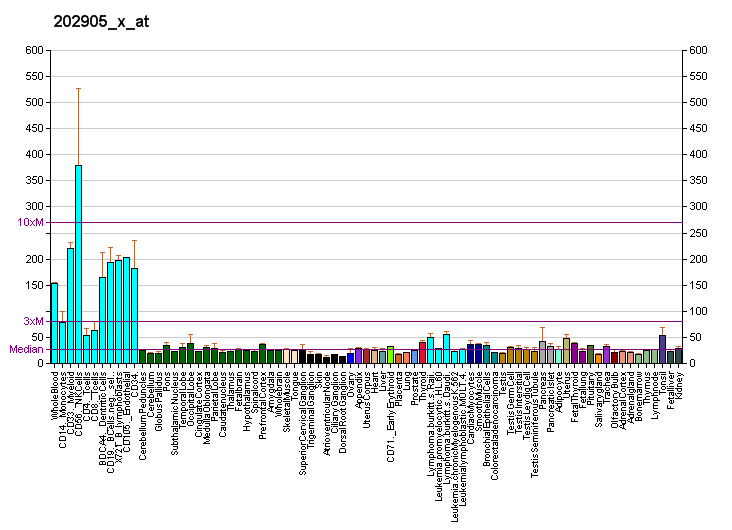

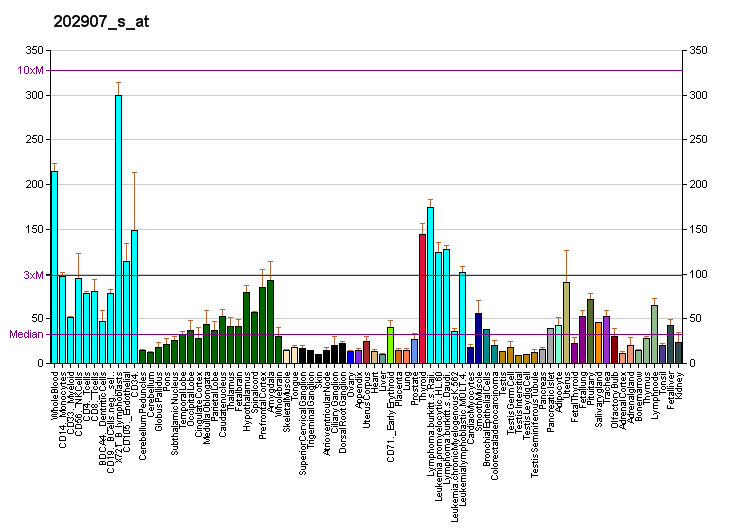
RNA expression pattern
Bgee	Human / Mouse (ortholog); Top expressed in: lactiferous duct; tail of epididymis; trigeminal ganglion; germinal epithelium; parietal pleura; decidua; superior surface of tongue; Achilles tendon; palpebral conjunctiva; bone marrow / Top expressed in: saccule; otic placode; otic vesicle; intercostal muscle; genital tubercle; tail of embryo; epiblast; primitive streak; medial head of gastrocnemius muscle; somite; More reference expression data
BioGPS	More reference expression data
Gene ontology
Molecular function	protein N-terminus binding; DNA helicase activity; transcription factor binding; protein binding; damaged DNA binding
Cellular component	site of double-strand break; cytosol; PML body; replication fork; nucleoplasm; chromosome; telomere; nucleolus; nuclear inclusion body; nucleus; Mre11 complex
Biological process	regulation of DNA-dependent DNA replication initiation; neuromuscular process controlling balance; mitotic cell cycle checkpoint signaling; positive regulation of kinase activity; telomeric 3' overhang formation; DNA damage checkpoint signaling; DNA damage response, signal transduction by p53 class mediator; in utero embryonic development; cellular response to DNA damage stimulus; intrinsic apoptotic signaling pathway; positive regulation of telomere maintenance; negative regulation of telomere capping; DNA duplex unwinding; meiosis; positive regulation of protein autophosphorylation; isotype switching; cell cycle; blastocyst growth; cell population proliferation; mitotic G2 DNA damage checkpoint signaling; double-strand break repair via nonhomologous end joining; telomere maintenance; double-strand break repair via homologous recombination; DNA synthesis involved in DNA repair; DNA repair; regulation of signal transduction by p53 class mediator; strand displacement; DNA replication; double-strand break repair; DNA double-strand break processing; t-circle formation; telomere maintenance via telomere trimming; telomere capping; signal transduction in response to DNA damage
Sources:Amigo / QuickGO
Orthologs
Databases	NCBI: entry; OMA: entry
Species	Human	Mouse
Entrez	4683	27354
Ensembl	ENSG00000104320	ENSMUSG00000028224
UniProt	O60934	Q9R207
RefSeq (mRNA)	NM_001024688; NM_002485	NM_013752
RefSeq (protein)	NP_001019859; NP_002476	NP_038780
Location (UCSC)	Chr 8: 89.93 – 90 Mb	Chr 4: 15.96 – 15.99 Mb
PubMed search
- Wikidata
View/Edit Human	View/Edit Mouse

Nibrin, also known as NBN or NBS1, is a protein which in humans is encoded by the NBN gene.

== Function ==
Nibrin is a protein associated with the repair of double strand breaks (DSBs) which pose serious damage to a genome. It is a 754 amino acid protein identified as a member of the NBS1/hMre11/RAD50(N/M/R, more commonly referred to as MRN) double strand DNA break repair complex. This complex recognizes DNA damage and rapidly relocates to DSB sites and forms nuclear foci. It also has a role in regulation of N/M/R (MRN) protein complex activity which includes end-processing of both physiological and mutagenic DNA double strand breaks (DSBs).

== Cellular response to DSBs ==
Cellular response is performed by damage sensors, effectors of lesion repair and signal transduction. The central role is carried out by ataxia telangiectasia mutated (ATM) by activating the DSB signaling cascade, phosphorylating downstream substrates such as histone H2AX and NBS1. NBS1 relocates to DSB sites by interaction of FHA/BRCT domains with phosphorylated histone H2AX. Once it interacts with nibrin c-terminal hMre11-binding domain, hMre11 and hRad50 relocate from the cytoplasm to the nucleus then to sites of DSBs. They finally relocate to N/M/R where they form the foci at the site of damage.

== Double strand breaks (DSBs) ==
DSBs occur during V(D)J recombination during early B and T cell development. This is at the point when the cells of the immune system are developing and the DSBs affect the development of lymphoid cells. DSBs also occur in immunoglobulin class switch in mature B cells. More frequently, however, DSBs are caused by mutagenic agents like radiomimetic chemicals and ionizing radiation(IR).

== DSB mutations ==
As mentioned, DSBs cause extreme damage to DNA. Mutations that cause defective repair of DSBs tend to accumulate un-repaired DSBs. One such mutation is associated with Nijmegen breakage syndrome (NBS), a radiation hyper-sensitive disease. It is a rare inherited autosomal recessive condition of chromosomal instability. It has been linked to mutations within exons 6–10 in the NBS1 gene which results in a truncated protein. Characteristics of NBS include microcephaly, cranial characteristics, growth retardation, impaired sexual maturation, immunodeficiency/recurring infections and a predisposition to cancer. This predisposition to cancer may be linked to the DSBs occurring at the development of lymphoid cells.

== Fertility ==
Two adult siblings, both heterozygous for two particular NBS1 nonsense mutations displayed cellular sensitivity to radiation, chromosome instability and fertility defects, but not the developmental defects that are typically found in other NBS patients. These individuals appear to be primarily defective in homologous recombination, a process that accurately repairs double-strand breaks, both in somatic cells and during meiosis.

Orthologs of NBS1 have been studied in mice and the plant arabidopsis. NBS1 mutant mice display cellular radiation sensitivity and female mice are sterile due to oogenesis failure. Studies of NBS1 mutants in Arabidopsis revealed that NBS1 has a role in recombination during early stages of meiosis.

== NBS1 over-expression in cancer ==
NBS1 has a role in microhomology-mediated end joining (MMEJ) repair of double strand breaks. It is one of six enzymes required for this error-prone DNA repair pathway. NBS1 is often over-expressed in prostate cancer, in liver cancer, in esophageal squamous cell carcinoma, in non-small cell lung carcinoma, hepatoma, and esophageal cancer, in head and neck cancer, and in squamous cell carcinoma of the oral cavity.

Cancers are very often deficient in expression of one or more DNA repair genes, but over-expression of a DNA repair gene is less usual in cancer. For instance, at least 36 DNA repair enzymes, when mutationally defective in germ line cells, cause increased risk of cancer (hereditary cancer syndromes). (Also see DNA repair-deficiency disorder.) Similarly, at least 12 DNA repair genes have frequently been found to be epigenetically repressed in one or more cancers. (See also Epigenetically reduced DNA repair and cancer.) Ordinarily, deficient expression of a DNA repair enzyme results in increased un-repaired DNA damages which, through replication errors (translesion synthesis), lead to mutations and cancer. However, NBS1 mediated MMEJ repair is highly inaccurate, so in this case, over-expression, rather than under-expression, apparently leads to cancer.

== Herpes virus ==
HSV-1 infects more than 90% of adults over the age of 50. Alphaherpesviruses alone can cause the host to have mild symptoms, but these viruses can be associated with severe disease when they are transferred to a new species. Humans can even pass and also get an HSV-1 infection from other primate species. However, because of evolutionary differences between primate species, only some species can pass HSV-1 in an interspecies interaction. Also, though HSV-1 transmission from humans to other species primates can occur, there is no known sustained transmission chains that have resulted from constant transmission. A study found that Nbs1 is the most diverged in DNA sequence in the MRN complex between different primate species and that there is a high degree of species specificity, causing variability in promotion of the HSV-1 life cycle. The same study found that Nbs1 interacts with HSV-1's ICP0 proteins in an area of structural disorder of the nibrin. This suggests that in general, viruses commonly interact in intrinsically disordered domains in host proteins. It is possible that there are differences in the mammalian genomes that create unique environments for the viruses. Host proteins that are specific to the species might determine how the viruses must adapt to be able to ignite an infection in a new species. The evolution of increased disorder in nibrin benefits the host in decreasing ICP0 interaction and virus hijack. Nbs1 may not be the only host protein that evolves this way.

HSV-1-infection has been shown to result from the phosphorylation of Nbs1. It has been shown in studies that activation of the MRN complex and ATM biochemical cascade is consistent for a resulting HSV-1 infection. When there is an HSV-1 infection, the nucleus is reorganized causing the formation of RCs (replication compartments) where gene expression and DNA replication occurs. Proteins in the host used for DNA repair and damage response are needed for virus production. ICP8, which is a viral single-strand binding protein, is known to interact with several DNA repair proteins, such as Rad50, Mre11, BRG1, and DNA-PKcs. Ul12 and ICP8 viral proteins function together as a recombinase, possibly showing that while working with the host's recombination factors, work to form a concatemer by stimulating homologous recombination. These proteins may move the MRN complex towards the viral genome so it is able to promote homologous recombination, and to prevent non-homologous recombination as non-homologous recombination can have anti-viral effects. This possibly shows that the reaction between UL12 and MRN regulates the complex in a way that benefits the herpes virus.

== Interactions ==
Nibrin has been shown to interact with:

- Ataxia telangiectasia mutated,
- BRCA1,
- H2AFX,
- MRE11A,
- Rad50, and
- TERF2
