= ICP8 =

ICP8, the herpes simplex virus type-1 single-strand DNA-binding protein, is one of seven proteins encoded in the viral genome of HSV-1 that is required for HSV-1 DNA replication. It is able to anneal to single-stranded DNA (ssDNA) as well as melt small fragments of double-stranded DNA (dsDNA); its role is to destabilize duplex DNA during initiation of replication. It differs from helicases because it is ATP- and Mg^{2+}-independent. In cells infected with HSV-1, the DNA in those cells become colocalized with ICP8.

ICP8 is required in late gene transcription, and has found to be associated with cellular RNA polymerase II holoenzyme.

== See also ==
- Virus
- Virology
