= BRCT domain =

BRCA1 C Terminus (BRCT) domain
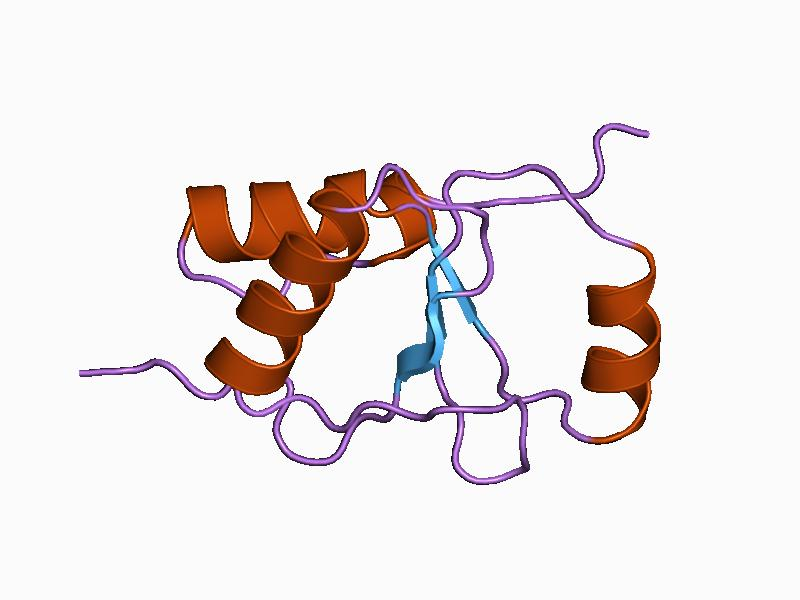
- Structure of an XRCC1 BRCT domain.

Identifiers
- Symbol: BRCT
- Pfam: PF00533
- InterPro: IPR001357
- SCOP2: 1cdz / SCOPe / SUPFAM
- CDD: cd00027
Available protein structures:
- Pfam: structures / ECOD
- PDB: RCSB PDB; PDBe; PDBj
- PDBsum: structure summary
- PDB: 2azmB:1906-1957 2adoB:1906-1957 2etxA:1906-1957 1kzyC:1795-1835 1l0bA:1589-1669 1t2vC:1646-1723 1n5oX:1646-1723 1t2uA:1646-1723 1jnxX:1646-1723 1t15A:1646-1723 1t29A:1646-1723 1y98A:1646-1723 2couA:91-166 1l7bA:589-664 2cokA:385-463 1wf6A:354-431 1ik9C:681-717 1cdzA:538-616 1oqaA:1756-1842 2coeA:27-111

BRCA1 C Terminus (BRCT) domain is a family of evolutionarily related proteins. It is named after the C-terminal domain of BRCA1, a DNA-repair protein that serves as a marker of breast cancer susceptibility.

The BRCT domain is found predominantly in proteins involved in cell cycle checkpoint functions responsive to DNA damage, for example as found in the breast cancer DNA-repair protein BRCA1. The domain is an approximately 100 amino acid tandem repeat, which appears to act as a phospho-protein binding domain.

== Examples ==
Human proteins containing this domain include:

- BARD1; BRCA1
- CTDP1; TDT or DNTT
- ECT2
- LIG4
- MCPH1; MDC1
- NBN
- PARP1; PARP4; PAXIP1; PES1
- REV1; RFC1; TOPBP1; TP53BP1; XRCC1
