= SAE2 (yeast) =

SAE2 is a gene in budding yeast, coding for the protein Sae2, which is involved in DNA repair. Sae2 is a part of the homologous recombination process in response to double-strand breaks. It is best characterized in the yeast model organism Saccharomyces cerevisiae. Homologous genes in other organisms include Ctp1 in fission yeast, Com1 in plants, and CtIP in higher eukaryotes including humans.

Sae2 and its homologs have relatively long low-complexity regions in their primary sequences and appear to have large intrinsically unstructured regions. Sae2 likely forms tetramers through coiled-coil sequences. Proteins of this family are DNA-binding proteins and are involved in DNA end resection and bridging at double-strand breaks. Sae2 has been reported to have endonuclease activity, though it has no bioinformatically recognizable nuclease sequence and reports of this activity are not consistent in the literature.
