= MRE11A =

Protein-coding gene in humans

MRE11

Identifiers
- Aliases: MRE11, ATLD, HNGS1, MRE11B, MRE11A, MRE11 homolog A, double strand break repair nuclease, MRE11 homolog, double strand break repair nuclease
- External IDs: OMIM: 600814; MGI: 1100512; GeneCards: MRE11
Available structures
PDB	Ortholog search: PDBe RCSB
PDB	List of PDB id codes 3T1I

Gene location (Human)
Chr.	Chromosome 11 (human)
Band	11q21	Start	94,415,570 bp
Band	11q21	End	94,493,885 bp

Gene location (Mouse)
Chr.	Chromosome 9 (mouse)
Band	9|9 A2	Start	14,695,950 bp
Band	9|9 A2	End	14,748,419 bp
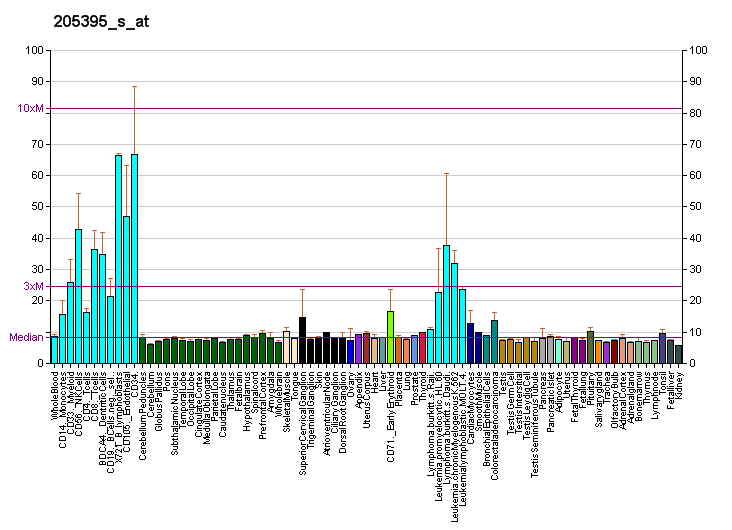
RNA expression pattern
Bgee	Human / Mouse (ortholog); Top expressed in: Achilles tendon; oocyte; secondary oocyte; testicle; sural nerve; gonad; epithelium of colon; monocyte; rectum; ventricular zone / Top expressed in: ectoderm; otic vesicle; otic placode; spermatid; spermatocyte; saccule; epiblast; tail of embryo; primitive streak; genital tubercle; More reference expression data
BioGPS	More reference expression data
Gene ontology
Molecular function	DNA binding; manganese ion binding; DNA helicase activity; single-stranded DNA endodeoxyribonuclease activity; protein C-terminus binding; protein binding; 3'-5' exonuclease activity; nuclease activity; endonuclease activity; double-stranded DNA binding; endodeoxyribonuclease activity; exonuclease activity; hydrolase activity; cadherin binding; identical protein binding; 3'-5'-exodeoxyribonuclease activity; 5'-3' exonuclease activity
Cellular component	site of double-strand break; cytosol; PML body; nucleus; cytoplasm; nucleoplasm; telomere; chromosome; Mre11 complex; replication fork
Biological process	reciprocal meiotic recombination; DNA recombination; telomere maintenance via telomerase; positive regulation of kinase activity; mitotic intra-S DNA damage checkpoint signaling; telomeric 3' overhang formation; negative regulation of apoptotic process; chromosome organization; sister chromatid cohesion; cellular response to DNA damage stimulus; positive regulation of telomere maintenance; DNA duplex unwinding; homologous chromosome pairing at meiosis; negative regulation of DNA endoreduplication; double-strand break repair; meiosis; double-strand break repair via homologous recombination; positive regulation of protein autophosphorylation; cell population proliferation; mitotic G2 DNA damage checkpoint signaling; viral process; double-strand break repair via nonhomologous end joining; positive regulation of type I interferon production; regulation of mitotic recombination; DNA repair; nucleic acid phosphodiester bond hydrolysis; DNA double-strand break processing; strand displacement; DNA replication; DNA synthesis involved in DNA repair; regulation of signal transduction by p53 class mediator; telomere maintenance; meiotic DNA double-strand break formation; mitochondrial double-strand break repair via homologous recombination; DNA strand resection involved in replication fork processing
Sources:Amigo / QuickGO
Orthologs
Databases	NCBI: entry; OMA: entry
Species	Human	Mouse
Entrez	4361	17535
Ensembl	ENSG00000020922	ENSMUSG00000031928
UniProt	P49959	Q61216
RefSeq (mRNA)	NM_005590; NM_005591; NM_001330347	NM_018736; NM_001310728
RefSeq (protein)	NP_001317276; NP_005581; NP_005582	NP_001297657; NP_061206
Location (UCSC)	Chr 11: 94.42 – 94.49 Mb	Chr 9: 14.7 – 14.75 Mb
PubMed search
- Wikidata
View/Edit Human	View/Edit Mouse

Double-strand break repair protein MRE11 (Meiotic recombination 11) is an enzyme that in humans is encoded by the MRE11 gene. The gene has been designated MRE11A to distinguish it from the pseudogene MRE11B that is nowadays named MRE11P1.

== Function ==
MRE11 functions as a member of the MRE11-RAD50-NBS1 (MRN) complex in mammals (or the MRE11-RAD50-XRS2 (MRX) complex in yeast). MRE11 is a DNA nuclease involved in multiple DNA double-strand break repair pathways, including homologous recombination, classical non-homologous end joining, and alternative non-homologous end joining. MRE11 activity also facilitates replication fork restart and telomere length maintenance. It also is essential for embryonic development and required for hematopoiesis and lymphopoiesis in mice. By itself, the protein has 3' to 5' exonuclease activity and endonuclease activity, which is stimulated when complexed with RAD50. CtIP/SAE2 is also known to stimulate MRE11 endonuclease activity to initiate homologous recombination or to process blocked DNA ends, such as the removal of SPO11 during meiosis, DNA-PKcs and Ku in mitotic cells, or other DNA-protein adducts such as topoisomerase cleavage complexes. In conjunction with a DNA ligase, this protein promotes the joining of noncomplementary ends in vitro using short stretches of homology near the ends of the DNA fragments. This gene has a pseudogene on chromosome 3. Alternative splicing of this gene results in two transcript variants encoding different isoforms.

== Orthologs ==
Mre11, an ortholog of human MRE11, occurs in the prokaryote archaeon Sulfolobus acidocaldarius. In this organism the Mre11 protein interacts with the Rad50 protein and appears to have an active role in the repair of DNA damages experimentally introduced by gamma radiation. Similarly, during meiosis in the eukaryotic protist Tetrahymena Mre11 is required for repair of DNA damages, in this case double-strand breaks, by a process that likely involves homologous recombination. These observations suggest that human MRE11 is descended from prokaryotic and protist ancestral Mre11 proteins that served a role in early processes for repairing DNA damage.

== Overexpression in cancer ==
MRE11 has a role in microhomology-mediated end joining (MMEJ) repair of double strand breaks. It is one of 6 enzymes required for this error prone DNA repair pathway. MRE11 is over-expressed in breast cancers.

Cancers are very often deficient in expression of one or more DNA repair genes, but over-expression of a DNA repair gene is less usual in cancer. For instance, at least 36 DNA repair enzymes, when mutationally defective in germ line cells, cause increased risk of cancer (hereditary cancer syndromes). (Also see DNA repair-deficiency disorder.) Similarly, at least 12 DNA repair genes have frequently been found to be epigenetically repressed in one or more cancers. (See also Epigenetically reduced DNA repair and cancer.) Ordinarily, deficient expression of a DNA repair enzyme results in increased un-repaired DNA damages which, through replication errors (translesion synthesis), lead to mutations and cancer. However, MRE11 mediated MMEJ repair is highly inaccurate, so in this case, over-expression, rather than under-expression, apparently leads to cancer.

== Interactions ==
MRE11 has been shown to interact with:

- ATM,
- BRCA1,
- Ku70,
- MDC1,
- NBN,
- Rad50,
- TERF2,
- CtIP/SAE2,
- CDK2, and
- MRNIP.

== See also ==
- Homologous recombination
