= Microhomology-mediated end joining =

Microhomology-mediated end joining (MMEJ), also known as alternative nonhomologous end-joining (Alt-NHEJ) is one of the pathways for repairing double-strand breaks in DNA. As reviewed by McVey and Lee, the foremost distinguishing property of MMEJ is the use of microhomologous sequences during the alignment of broken ends before joining, thereby resulting in deletions flanking the original break. MMEJ is frequently associated with chromosome abnormalities such as deletions, translocations, inversions and other complex rearrangements.

There are multiple pathways for repairing double strand breaks, mainly non-homologous end joining (NHEJ), homologous recombination (HR), and MMEJ. NHEJ directly joins both ends of the double strand break and is relatively accurate, although small (usually less than a few nucleotides) insertions or deletions sometimes occur. HR is highly accurate and uses the sister chromatid as a template for accurate repair of the DSB. MMEJ is distinguished from these other repair mechanisms by its use of microhomologous sequences to align the broken strands. This results in frequent deletions and occasionally insertions which are much larger than those produced by NHEJ. MMEJ is completely independent from classical NHEJ and does not rely on NHEJ core factors such as Ku protein, DNA-PK, or Ligase IV.

In MMEJ, repair of the DSB is initiated by end resection by the MRE nuclease, leaving single stranded overhangs. These single stranded overhangs anneal at microhomologies, which are short regions of complementarity, often 5–25 base pairs, between the two strands. A specialized form of MMEJ, called polymerase theta-mediated end-joining (TMEJ), is able to repair breaks using ≥1 bp of homology. The helicase domain of DNA polymerase theta possesses ATP-dependent single-strand annealing activity and may promote annealing of microhomologies. Following annealing, any overhanging bases (flaps) are removed by nucleases such as Fen1 and gaps are filled in by DNA polymerase theta. This gap-filling ability of polymerase theta helps to stabilize the annealing of ends with minimal complementarity. Besides microhomology footprints, polymerase theta's mutational signature also consists of (infrequent) templated inserts, which are thought to be the result of aborted template-dependent extension, followed by re-annealing at secondary homologous sequences.

== Cell cycle regulation ==
MMEJ repair is low in G0/G1 phase but is increased during S-phase and G2 phase of the cell cycle. In contrast, NHEJ operates throughout the cell cycle, and homologous recombination (HR) operates only in late S and G2.

== Double strand break repair pathway choice ==
The choice of which pathway is used for double strand break repair is complex. In most cases, MMEJ accounts for a minor proportion (10%) of double strand break repair, most likely in cases where the double strand break is resected but a sister chromatid is not available for homologous recombination. Cells which are deficient in either classical NHEJ or HR typically display increased MMEJ. Human homologous recombination factors suppress mutagenic MMEJ following double-strand break resection.

== Genes required ==
A biochemical assay system shows that at least 6 genes are required for microhomology-mediated end joining: FEN1, Ligase III, MRE11, NBS1, PARP1 and XRCC1. All six of these genes are up-regulated in one or more cancers. In humans, DNA polymerase theta, encoded by the POLQ gene, plays a central role in microhomology-mediated end joining. Polymerase theta utilizes its helicase domain to displace replication protein A (RPA) from DNA ends and promote microhomology annealing. Polymerase theta also uses its polymerase activity to conduct fill-in synthesis, which helps to stabilize paired ends.

Helicase Q, which is conserved in humans, is necessary for polymerase theta-independent MMEJ, as shown using mutational footprint analyses in Caenorrhabditis elegans.

== In cancer ==
Approximately half of all ovarian cancers are deficient in homologous recombination (HR). These HR-deficient tumors upregulate polymerase theta (POLQ), resulting in an increase in MMEJ. These tumors are hyper-reliant upon MMEJ, so that knockdown of polymerase theta results in substantial lethality. In most cell types, MMEJ makes a minor contribution to double strand break repair. The hyper-reliance of HR-deficient tumors upon MMEJ may represent a possible drug target for cancer treatment.

MMEJ always involves insertions or deletions, so that it is a mutagenic pathway. Cells with increased MMEJ may have higher genomic instability and a predisposition towards cancer development, although this has not been demonstrated directly.

== In a crustacean ==
Penaeus monodon is a marine crustacean widely consumed for its nutritional value. Repair of double-strand breaks in this organism can occur by HRR, but NHEJ is undetectable. While HRR appears to be the major double-strand break repair pathway, MMEJ was also found to play a significant role in repair of DNA double-strand breaks.

== General references ==
- MMEJ repair of double-strand breaks (director's cut): deleted sequences and alternative endings
- DNA double strand break repair in human bladder cancer is error prone and involves microhomology-associated end-joining
- Distinctive differences in DNA double-strand break repair between normal urothelial and urothelial carcinoma cells
