= DNA repair protein RAD50 =

Protein found in humans

An Error has occurred retrieving Wikidata item for infobox DNA repair protein RAD50, also known as RAD50, is a protein that in humans is encoded by the RAD50 gene.

== Function ==
The protein encoded by this gene is highly similar to Saccharomyces cerevisiae Rad50, a protein involved in DNA double-strand break repair. This protein forms a complex with MRE11 and NBS1 (also known as Xrs2 in yeast). This MRN complex (MRX complex in yeast) binds to broken DNA ends and displays numerous enzymatic activities that are required for double-strand break repair by nonhomologous end-joining or homologous recombination. Gene knockout studies of the mouse homolog of Rad50 suggest it is essential for cell growth and viability. Two alternatively spliced transcript variants of Rad50, which encode distinct proteins, have been reported.

== Structure ==
Rad50 is a member of the structural maintenance of chromosomes (SMC) family of proteins. Like other SMC proteins, Rad50 contains a long internal coiled-coil domain that folds back on itself, bringing the N- and C-termini together to form a globular ABC ATPase head domain. Rad50 can dimerize both through its head domain and through a zinc-binding dimerization motif at the opposite end of the coiled-coil known as the "zinc-hook". Results from atomic force microscopy suggest that in free Mre11-Rad50-Nbs1 complexes, the zinc-hooks of a single Rad50 dimer associate to form a closed loop, while the zinc-hooks snap apart upon binding DNA, adopting a conformation that is thought to enable zinc-hook-mediated tethering of broken DNA ends.

== Interactions ==
Rad50 has been shown to interact with:

- BRCA1,
- MRE11A,
- NBN,
- RINT1,
- TERF2IP, and
- TERF2.

== Evolutionary ancestry ==
Rad50 protein has been mainly studied in eukaryotes. However, recent work has shown that orthologs of the Rad50 protein are also conserved in extant prokaryotic archaea where they likely function in homologous recombinational repair. In the hyperthermophilic archeon Sulfolobus acidocaldarius, the Rad50 and Mre11 proteins interact and appear to have an active role in repair of DNA damages introduced by gamma radiation. These findings suggest that eukaryotic Rad50 may be descended from an ancestral archaeal Rad50 protein that served a role in homologous recombinational repair of DNA damage. In yeast, the functions controlled by the RAD50 gene are essential for normal meiosis. It appears that the normal functions specified by RAD50 are not essential for either the initial or terminal steps in meiosis, but are required for successful recombination.

== Diseases ==
Human RAD50 deficiency is an autosomal recessive syndrome that has been reported in patients with microcephaly and short stature. Their clinical phenotype resembled Nijmegen breakage syndrome. Cells from these patients showed increased radiosensitity with an impaired response to chromosome breaks.

== See also ==
- MRN complex
- Homologous recombination
