= Forkhead-associated domain =

FHA domain
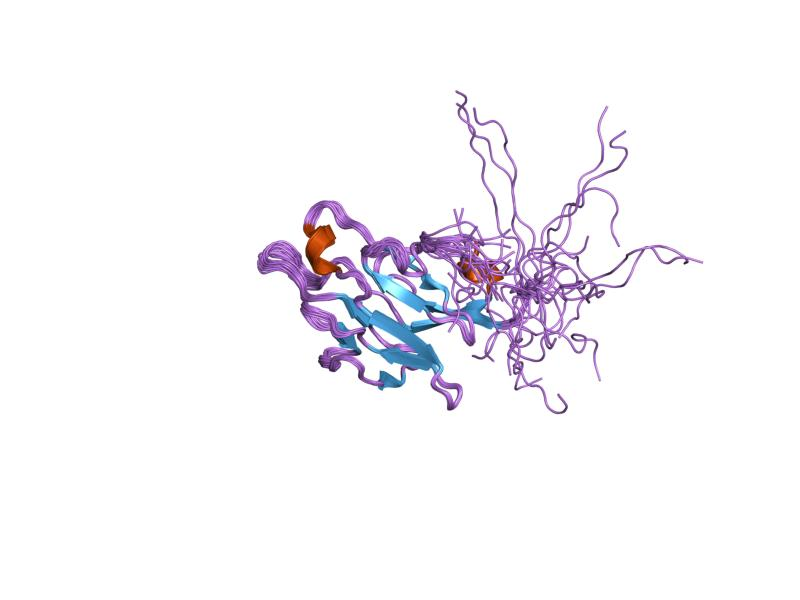
- solution structure of the fha domain of human ubiquitin ligase protein rnf8

Identifiers
- Symbol: FHA
- Pfam: PF00498
- Pfam clan: CL0357
- InterPro: IPR000253
- PROSITE: PDOC50006
- SCOP2: 1qu5 / SCOPe / SUPFAM
Available protein structures:
- PDB: IPR000253 PF00498 (ECOD; PDBsum)
- AlphaFold: IPR000253; PF00498

In molecular biology, the forkhead-associated domain (FHA domain) is a phosphopeptide recognition domain found in many regulatory proteins. It displays specificity for phosphothreonine-containing epitopes but will also recognise phosphotyrosine with relatively high affinity. It spans approximately 80-100 amino acid residues folded into an 11-stranded beta sandwich, which sometimes contains small helical insertions between the loops connecting the strands.

To date, genes encoding FHA-containing proteins have been identified in bacterial, eukaryotic and archaeal genomes. The domain is present in a diverse range of proteins, such as kinases, phosphatases, kinesins, transcription factors, RNA-binding proteins, and metabolic enzymes which partake in many different cellular processes - DNA repair, signal transduction, vesicular transport, and protein degradation are just a few examples.

== DNA repair ==
The forkhead associated (FHA) domain of polynucleotide kinase phosphatase (PNKP) is necessary for the recruitment of PNKP to damage sites in DNA. PNKP is active in the repair of DNA damage by the processes of base excision repair, single-strand break repair, and non-homologous end joining in the case of double strand breaks. In these activities, PNKP acts both as a kinase and a phosphatase in the ligation of DNA ends. The kinase domain phosphorylates 5' hydroxyl ends, and the phosphatase domain removes phosphates from 3' ends. These activities, acting together, prepare single-strand breaks with damaged termini for ligation.
