= MRN complex =

Protein complex

The MRN complex (MRX complex in yeast) is a protein complex consisting of Mre11, Rad50 and Nbs1 (also known as Nibrin in humans and as Xrs2 in yeast). In eukaryotes, the MRN/X complex plays an important role in the initial processing of double-strand DNA breaks prior to repair by homologous recombination or non-homologous end joining. The MRN complex binds avidly to double-strand breaks both in vitro and in vivo and may serve to tether broken ends prior to repair by non-homologous end joining or to initiate DNA end resection prior to repair by homologous recombination. The MRN complex also participates in activating the checkpoint kinase ATM in response to DNA damage. Production of short single-strand oligonucleotides by Mre11 endonuclease activity has been implicated in ATM activation by the MRN complex.

== Evolutionary ancestry and biologic function ==
The MRN complex has been mainly studied in eukaryotes. However, recent work shows that two of the three protein components of this complex, Mre11 and Rad50, are also conserved in extant prokaryotic archaea. This finding suggests that key components of the eukaryotic MRN complex are derived by evolutionary descent from the archaea. In the archaeon Sulfolobus acidocaldarius, the Mre11 protein interacts with the Rad50 protein and appears to have an active role in the repair of DNA damages experimentally introduced by gamma radiation. Similarly, during meiosis in the eukaryotic protist Tetrahymena Mre11 is required for repair of DNA damages, in this case double-strand breaks, by a process that likely involves homologous recombination.

== Biological function ==
=== Repair of double-strand DNA breaks ===
In eukaryotes, the MRN complex (through cooperation of its subunits) has been identified as a crucial player in many stages of the repair process of double-strand DNA breaks: initial detection of a lesion, halting of the cell cycle to allow for repair, selection of a specific repair pathway (i.e., via homologous recombination or non-homologous end joining) and providing mechanisms for initiating reconstruction of the DNA molecule (primarily via spatial juxtaposition of the ends of broken chromosomes). Initial detection is thought to be controlled by both Nbs1 and MRE11. Likewise, cell cycle checkpoint regulation is ultimately controlled by phosphorylation activity of the ATM kinase, which is pathway dependent on both Nbs1 and MRE11. MRE11 alone is known to contribute to repair pathway selection, while MRE11 and Rad50 work together to spatially align DNA molecules: Rad50 tethers two linear DNA molecules together while MRE11 fine-tunes the alignment by binding to the ends of the broken chromosomes.

=== Telomere maintenance ===
Telomeres maintain the integrity of the ends of linear chromosomes during replication and protect them from being recognized as double-strand breaks by the DNA repair machinery. MRN participates in telomere maintenance primarily via association with the TERF2 protein of the shelterin complex. Additional studies have suggested that Nbs1 is a necessary component protein for telomere elongation by telomerase. Additionally, knockdown of MRN has been shown to significantly reduce the length of the G-overhang at human telomere ends, which could inhibit the proper formation of the so-called T-loop, destabilizing the telomere as a whole. Telomere lengthening in cancer cells by the alternative lengthening of telomeres (ALT) mechanism has also been shown to be dependent on MRN, especially on the Nbs1 subunit. Taken together, these studies suggest MRN plays a crucial role in maintenance of both length and integrity of telomeres.

== Role in human disease ==
Mutations in MRE11 have been identified in patients with an ataxia-telangiectasia-like disorder (ATLD). Mutations in RAD50 have been linked to a Nijmegen Breakage Syndrome-like disorder (NBSLD). Mutations in the NBN gene, encoding the human Nbs1 subunit of the MRN complex, are causal for Nijmegen Breakage Syndrome. All three disorders belong to a group of chromosomal instability syndromes that are associated with impaired DNA damage response and increased cellular sensitivity to ionising radiation.

== Role in human cancer ==
The MRN complex's roles in cancer development are as varied as its biological functions. Double-strand DNA breaks, which it monitors and signals for repair, may themselves be the cause of carcinogenic genetic alteration, suggesting MRN provides a protective effect during normal cell homeostasis. However, upregulation of MRN complex sub-units has been documented in certain cancer cell lines when compared to non-malignant somatic cells, suggesting some cancer cells have developed a reliance on MRN overexpression. Since tumor cells have increased mitotic rates compared to non-malignant cells this is not entirely unexpected, as it is plausible that an increased rate of DNA replication necessitates higher nuclear levels of the MRN complex. However, there is mounting evidence that MRN is itself a component of carcinogenesis, metastasis and overall cancer aggression.

=== Tumorigenesis ===
In mice models, mutations in the Nbs1 subunit of MRN alone (producing the phenotypic analog of Nijmegen Breakage Syndrome in humans) have failed to produce tumorigenesis. However, double knockout mice with mutated Nbs1 which were also null of the p53 tumor suppressor gene displayed tumor onset significantly earlier than their p53 wildtype controls. This implies that Nbs1 mutations are themselves sufficient for tumorigenesis; a lack of malignancy in the control seems attributable to the activity of p53, not of the benignity of Nbs1 mutations. Extension studies have confirmed an increase in B and T-cell lymphomas in Nbs1-mutated mice in conjunction with p53 suppression, indicating potential p53 inactivation in lymphomagenesis, which occurs more often in NBS patients. Knockdown of MRE11 in various human cancer cell lines has also been associated with a 3-fold increase in the level of p16INK4a tumor suppressor protein, which is capable of inducing cellular senescence and subsequently halting tumor cell proliferation. This is thought primarily to be the result of methylation of the p16INK4 promotor gene by MRE11. These data suggest maintaining the integrity and normal expression levels of MRN provides a protective effect against tumorigenesis.

=== Metastasis ===
Suppression of MRE11 expression in genetically engineered human breast (MCF7) and bone (U2OS) cancer cell lines has resulted in decreased migratory capacity of these cells, indicating MRN may facilitate metastatic spread of cancer. Decreased expression of MMP-2 and MMP-3 matrix metalloproteinases, which are known to facilitate invasion and metastasis, occurred concomitantly in these MRE11 knockdown cells. Similarly, overexpression of Nbs1 in human head and neck squamous cell carcinoma (HNSCC) samples has been shown to induce epithelial–mesenchymal transition (EMT), which itself plays a critical role in cancer metastasis. In this same study, Nbs1 levels were significantly higher in secondary tumor samples than in samples from the primary tumor, providing evidence of a positive correlation between metastatic spread of tumor cells and levels of MRN expression. Taken together, these data suggest at least two of the three subunits of MRN play a role in mediating tumor metastasis, likely via an association between overexpressed MRN and both endogenous (EMT transition) and exogenous (ECM structure) cell migratory mechanisms.

=== Aggression ===
Cancer cells almost universally possess upregulated telomere maintenance mechanisms which allows for their limitless replicative potential. The MRN complex's biological role in telomere maintenance has prompted research linking MRN to cancer cell immortality. In human HNSCC cell lines, disruption of the Nbs1 gene (which downregulates expression of the entire MRN complex), has resulted in reduced telomere length and persistent lethal DNA damage in these cells. When combined with treatment of PARP (poly (ADP-ribose) polymerase) inhibitor (known as PARPi), these cells showed an even greater reduction in telomere length, arresting tumor cell proliferation both in vitro and in vivo via mouse models grafted with various HNSCC cell lines. While treatment with PARPi alone has been known to induce apoptosis in BRCA mutated cancer cell lines, this study shows that MRN downregulation can sensitize BRCA-proficient cells (those not possessing BRCA mutations) to treatment with PARPi, offering an alternative way to control tumor aggression.

The MRN complex has also been implicated in several pathways contributing to the insensitivity of cancer stem cells to the DNA damaging effects of chemotherapy and radiation treatment, which is a source of overall tumor aggression. Specifically, the MRN inhibitor Mirin (inhibiting MRE11) has been shown to disrupt the ability of ATM kinase to control the G2-M DNA damage checkpoint, which is required for repair of double-strand DNA breaks. The loss of this checkpoint strips cancer stem cells' ability to repair lethal genetic lesions, making them vulnerable to DNA damaging therapeutic agents. Likewise, overexpression of Nbs1 in HNSCC cells has been correlated with increased activation of the PI3K/AKT pathway, which itself has been shown to contribute to tumor aggression by reducing apoptosis. Overall, cancer cells appear to rely on MRN's signaling and repair capabilities in response to DNA damage in order to achieve resistance to modern chemo- and radiation therapies.

== See also ==
- Homologous recombination
- MRE11A
- Rad50
