= TOPBP1 =

Protein-coding gene in the species Homo sapiens

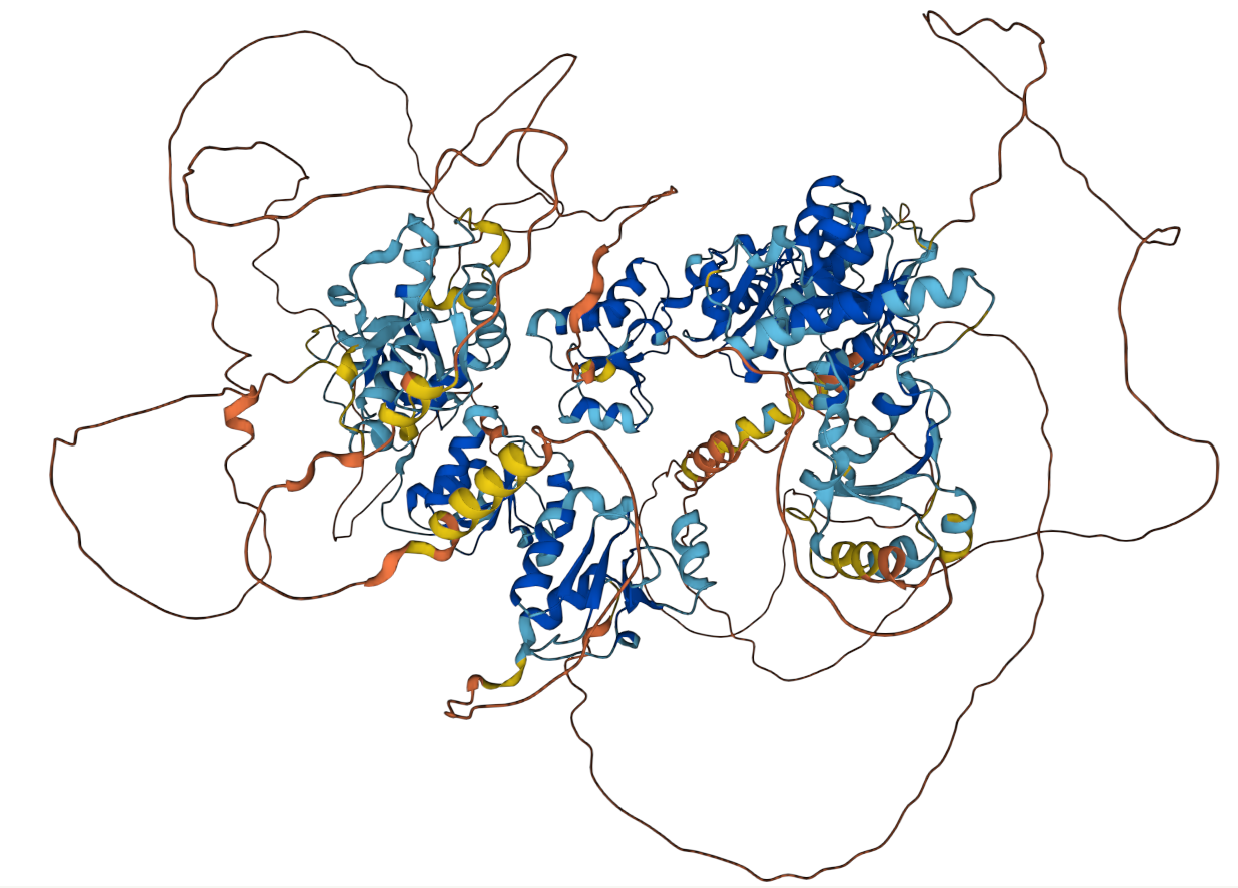

Identifiers
- Aliases: TOPBP1, TOP2BP1, topoisomerase (DNA) II binding protein 1, DNA topoisomerase II binding protein 1, Dpb11
- External IDs: OMIM: 607760; MGI: 1920018; GeneCards: TOPBP1
Available structures
| PDB | Ortholog search: PDBe RCSB |
| PDB | List of PDB id codes 1WF6, 2XNH, 2XNK, 3AL2, 3AL3, 3JVE, 3OLC, 3PD7, 3UEN, 3UEO |

Gene location (Human)
| Chr. | Chromosome 3 (human) |
| Band | 3q22.1 | Start | 133,598,175 bp |
| Band | 3q22.1 | End | 133,662,380 bp |

Gene location (Mouse)
| Chr. | Chromosome 9 (mouse) |
| Band | 9|9 F1 | Start | 103,182,414 bp |
| Band | 9|9 F1 | End | 103,227,627 bp |
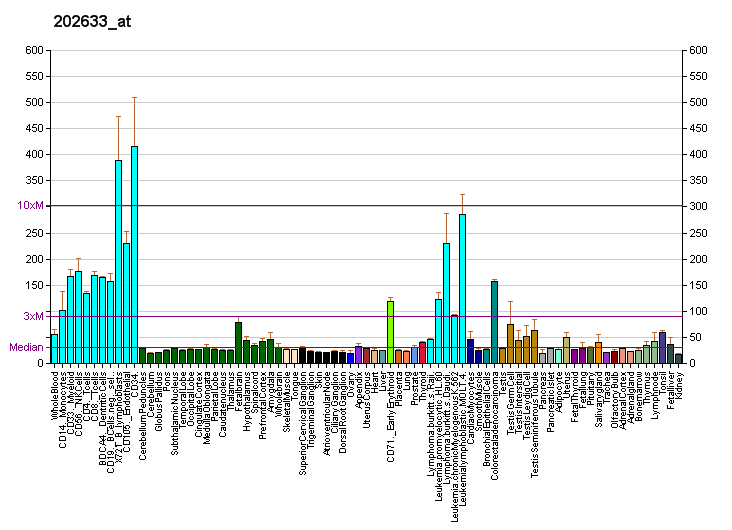
RNA expression pattern
| Bgee | Human / Mouse (ortholog); Top expressed in: sperm; ventricular zone; ganglionic eminence; bone marrow; bone marrow cell; rectum; Achilles tendon; appendix; monocyte; lymph node / Top expressed in: tail of embryo; otic placode; genital tubercle; abdominal wall; saccule; otic vesicle; primitive streak; dermis; mandibular prominence; ventricular zone; More reference expression data |
| BioGPS | More reference expression data |
Gene ontology
| Molecular function | DNA binding; protein C-terminus binding; protein binding; identical protein binding; isomerase activity |
| Cellular component | PML body; spindle pole; male germ cell nucleus; nucleoplasm; microtubule organizing center; chromosome; condensed nuclear chromosome; actin cytoskeleton; cytoskeleton; nucleus; cytoplasm; nuclear body |
| Biological process | response to ionizing radiation; DNA metabolic process; cellular response to DNA damage stimulus; DNA repair; DNA replication initiation; mitotic G2 DNA damage checkpoint signaling; mitotic DNA replication checkpoint signaling; DNA replication; regulation of signal transduction by p53 class mediator |
Sources:Amigo / QuickGO
Orthologs
| Databases | NCBI: entry; OMA: entry |
| Species | Human | Mouse |
| Entrez | 11073 | 235559 |
| Ensembl | ENSG00000163781 | ENSMUSG00000032555 |
| UniProt | Q92547 | Q6ZQF0 |
| RefSeq (mRNA) | NM_007027; NM_001363889 | NM_176979 |
| RefSeq (protein) | NP_008958; NP_001350818; NP_008958.2 | NP_795953 |
| Location (UCSC) | Chr 3: 133.6 – 133.66 Mb | Chr 9: 103.18 – 103.23 Mb |
| PubMed search |
- Wikidata
| View/Edit Human | View/Edit Mouse |

DNA topoisomerase 2-binding protein 1 (TOPBP1) is a scaffold protein that in humans is encoded by the TOPBP1 gene.

TOPBP1 was first identified as a protein binding partner of DNA topoisomerase-IIβ by a yeast 2-hybrid screen, giving it its name. TOPBP1 is involved in a variety of nuclear specific events. These include DNA damage repair, DNA replication, transcriptional regulation, and cell cycle checkpoint activation. TOPBP1 primarily regulates the DNA damage repair response through its ability to activate the damage response kinase, ataxia-telangiectasia mutated and RAD3-related (ATR). It also plays a critical role in DNA replication initiation and regulation of the cell cycle. Changes in TOPBP1 gene expression are associated with pulmonary hypertension, breast cancer, glioblastoma, non-small cell lung cancer, and sarcomas.

== Structure ==
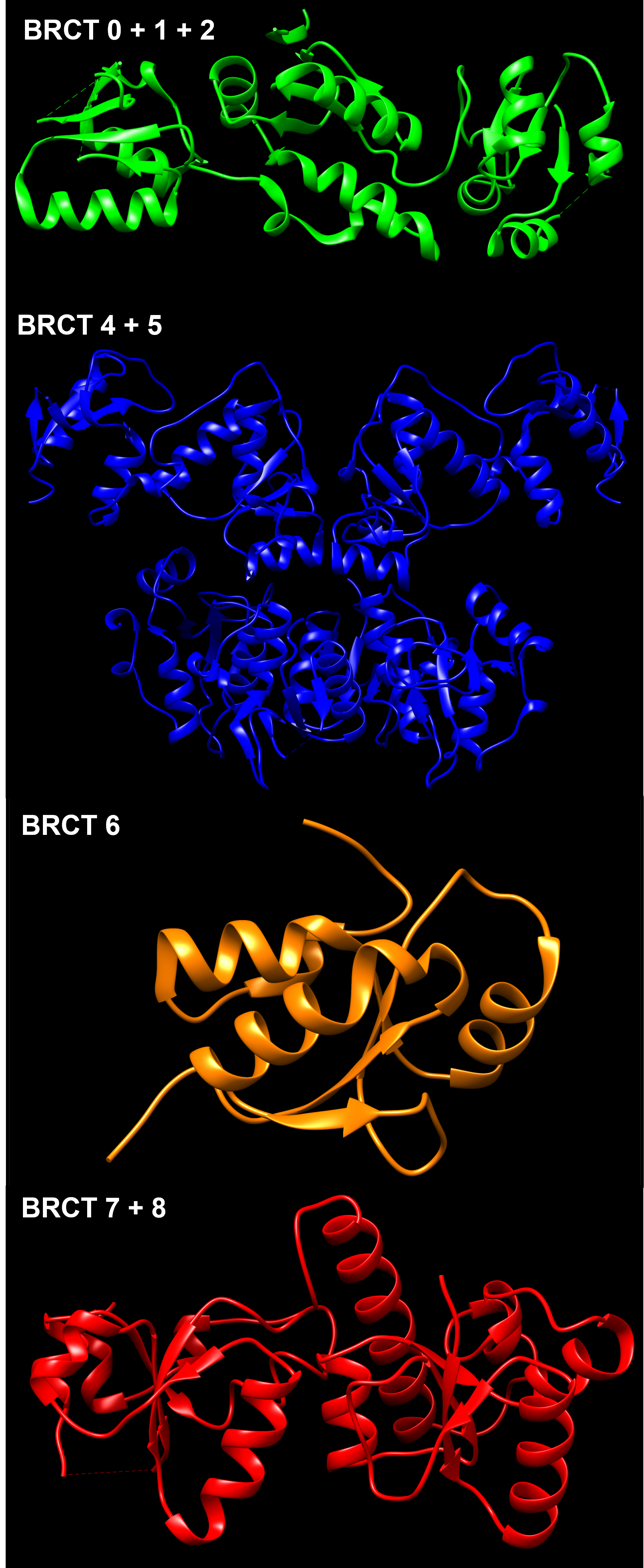
Structure of TOPBP1 organized by its BRCT domains. BRCT domains 0 + 1 + 2 (6HM5), BRCT domains 4 + 5 ( 3UEO), BRCT domain 6 (3JVE), BRCT domains 7 + 8 (3AL2).

=== BRCT domains ===
The TOPBP1 gene encodes a scaffold protein which facilitates interactions between different proteins at specific times and locations. It accomplishes these interactions with other protein partners through its breast cancer associated gene 1 C-terminus (BRCT) domains. A BRCT domain is structurally defined by a 4 member β sheet that is bookended by one α-helix (α2) and two other α-helices (α1 and α3). The amino acid residues that make up these core features are highly conserved, with protein specific deviations occurring in the loops that connect these subunits. BRCT domains canonically act in pairs, with one domain acting as the acceptor for phosphorylated binding partners and the other domain possessing a binding motif that provides specificity. These pairs are separated by a linker sequence that varies by protein. The paired domains associate through hydrophobic packing interactions that occur between the N-terminal BRCT domain's α2 helix and the C-terminal BRCT domain's α1 and α3 helices. These interactions facilitate BRCT domain binding with phosphorylated binding partners. In contrast, BRCT domains can also exist as either single domains or as a fusion of two different domains.

Human TOPBP1 has nine unique BRCT domains, with four conserved from the budding yeast homologue Dpb11 (i.e. BRCT1,2 and BRCT4,5). In human TOPBP1 the BRCT0, BRCT1, and BRCT2 domains uniquely exist in triple domain form, which is in contrast to the yeast Dpb11 canonical double domain. Only the BRCT3 and BRCT6 domains exist as single domains and may not be able to bind phosphoprotein partners TOPBP1 also contains an ATR activation domain (AAD) that is located between the BRCT6 and BRCT7 domains. Through these BRCT specific interactions TOPBP1 mediates DNA damage repair, DNA replication, transcription, and mitosis.

TOPBP1 interacting proteins
| | DNA Repair | DNA Replication | Transcriptional Regulation | Cell cycle |
|---|---|---|---|---|
| BRCT0/1/2 | BRCA1, MDC1, Rad9 | Treslin, CDC45 | | Rad9, 53BP1 |
| BRCT4/5 | BLM, BRCA1 | | | MDC1, 53BP1 |
| BRCT6 | | CDC45 | E2F-1, PARP1, SPBP, E2 | |
| BRCT7/8 | BRCA1, PLK1, TOP2A | RecQ4 | TOPBP1, p53, Miz1, E2 | FancJ, TOP2A |
| AAD | ATR | | | ATR |
| N/A | SLX4 | | | SLX4 |

To regulate its activity, TOPBP1 has been found to self-oligomerize at the BRCT7/8 domains, as it responds to replicative stress.

== Function ==
=== DNA damage repair ===
TOPBP1 was first identified as a DNA damage protein through its association with BRCA1, which is a protein heavily implicated in breast cancer pathology. TOPBP1 was found in complex with BRCA1 at sites independent from replication forks (i.e identified by the DNA replication clamp proliferating cell nuclear antigen) during normal S phase. When DNA damage was induced at higher levels by γ irradiation, there was an increase in TOPBP1/BRCA1 at sites away from replication forks. In contrast, when replication forks were stalled by hydroxyurea to generate DNA replication stress, TOPBP1/BRCA1 were found at sites of replication forks. This showed a DNA damage specific role for TOPBP1 recruitment at both replication sites and non-replication sites. To mediate these aspects of DNA repair, TOPBP1 was found to associate with Rad9, which forms a complex with Rad1 and Hus1, hereby termed the 9-1-1 DNA repair clamp. TOPBP1 binds to Rad9 with its BRCT0/1/2 domains. The BRCT1 domain was found to be directly responsible for mediating the phosphorylation dependent interaction with Rad9.

DNA damage repair is initiated and maintained by two kinases, ataxia-telangiectasia mutated (ATM) and ATR, with ATR proving to be more important for maintaining the genome. TOPBP1 has been shown to be an activator of ATR, leading to an increase in the kinase activity of ATR. Following instances of DNA damage that lead to double stranded breaks (DSBs) and subsequent repair mediated resection, there will be long sequences of single stranded DNA (ssDNA) exposed. This ssDNA will become coated with replication protein A (RPA). ATR is successfully honed to RPA coated ssDNA by ATR interacting protein (ATRIP). The junction of RPA coated ssDNA and intact double stranded DNA (dsDNA) is where TOPBP1 and the 9-1-1 clamp is recruited. In addition to TOPBP1, ATR has also been found to be activated by the ssDNA specific, RPA interacting protein ETAA1.

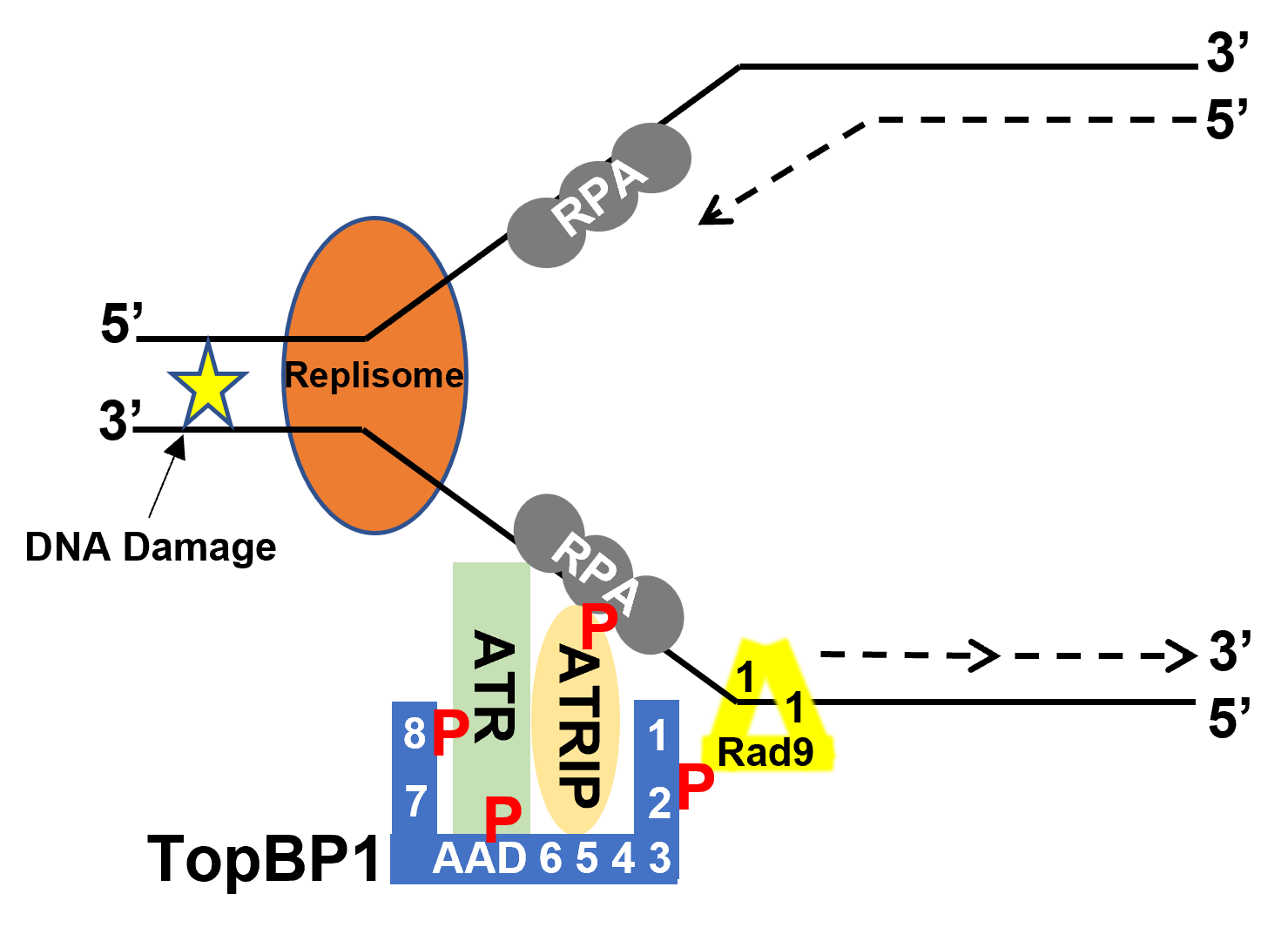
TOPBP1 Activation of ATR in DNA Damage Response

TOPBP1/9-1-1 recruitment is conducted independent of ATRIP/ATR which serves as a regulatory mechanism that prevents both premature and non-specific activation of the DNA damage response pathway. TOPBP1 interacts with ATR through its ATR activating domain (AAD), which is located between the BRCT domains 6 and 7. The AAD domain of TOPBP1 alone is sufficient for activating ATR kinase activity in vitro. Knockdowns of TOPBP1 gene expression leads to a reduction in phosphorylation of downstream ATR kinase targets. The specific activation mechanism of ATR is still unknown, but it is thought that TOPBP1 binding to ATR induces a conformational change that promotes catalysis above baseline kinase activity. Following ATR activation, it is able to phosphorylate downstream DNA damage associated factors, with the primary effector being the kinase Chk1.

Recombinant TOPBP1 protein is sufficient for ATR activation, signifying that regulation of TOPBP1 activity is not through post-translational modifications. Thus, it is thought to be regulated by either sub-cellular localization (i.e. movement to the nucleus for activation) and/or protein concentration. This is further supported by the fact that TOPBP1 reduces the K_{m} of ATR for its various substrates. In addition, TOPBP1 can be phosphorylated by ATM, which increases the efficiency of TOPBP1 mediated activation of ATR.

=== DNA repair during meiosis ===
The CIP2A-MDC1-TOPBP1 complex is employed in the repair of DNA damages during meiosis in oocytes. This repair process occurs via a microtubule-dependent recruitment of the CIP2A-MDC1-TOPBP1 complex from spindle pole to chromosomes.

=== DNA replication ===
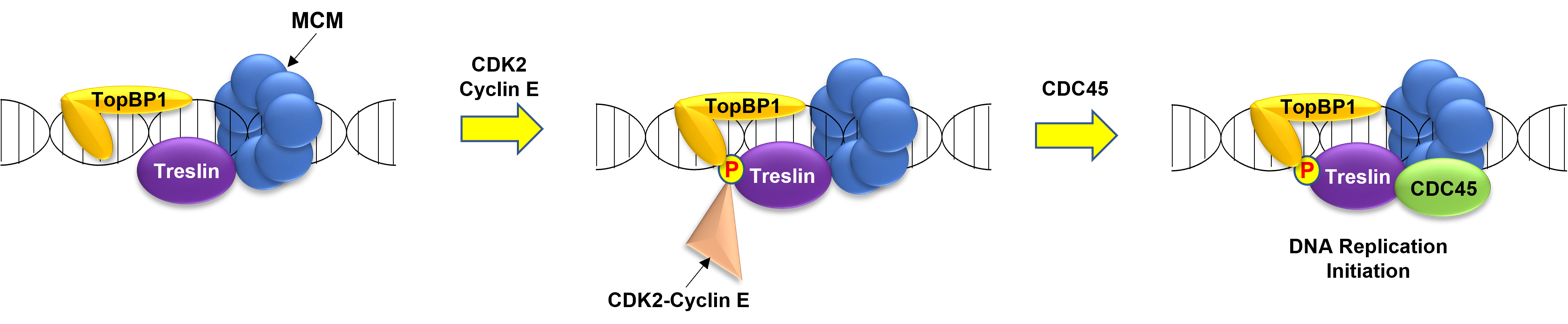
As the cell enters S phase, the MCM complex is loaded onto double stranded DNA in anticipation of replication. Treslin is phosphorylated by the cell cycle checkpoint kinase CDK2, which allows it to interact with TOPBP1. The Treslin-TOPBP1 complex recruits CDC45 to the MCM complex and DNA replication is officially initiated.

Human TOPBP1 is required for the initiation of DNA replication through its association with the proteins Treslin, CDC45, and RecQ4. In yeast, the TOPBP1 homologue Dpb11 has been shown to recruit DNA polymerase ε (Polε) and the GINs complex to the origin of replication which has been pre-loaded with the minichromosome maintenance (MCM) complex. It accomplishes this by binding to Sld2 (Polε associated factor) and Sld3 (CDC45 associated factor) in a cyclin dependent kinase (CDK) phosphorylation dependent manner. This leads to the formation of the pre-initiation complex, i.e. the CDC45–MCM–GINS (CMG) replicative helicase. In summary, TOPBP1 acts as a scaffolding protein that facilitates the interactions necessary to form the DNA replication pre-initiation complex. In humans the mechanism is not fully understood yet, but TOPBP1 interacts with RecQ4 (Sld2) and Treslin (Sld3).

TOPBP1 has also been shown to interact with another DNA helicase, DNA helicase B (HELB), which is part of the 1B helicase superfamily and is involved in both DNA replication and repair. This interaction between TOPBP1 and HELB has also been implicated in CDC45 mediated initiation of DNA replication.

=== Transcriptional regulation ===
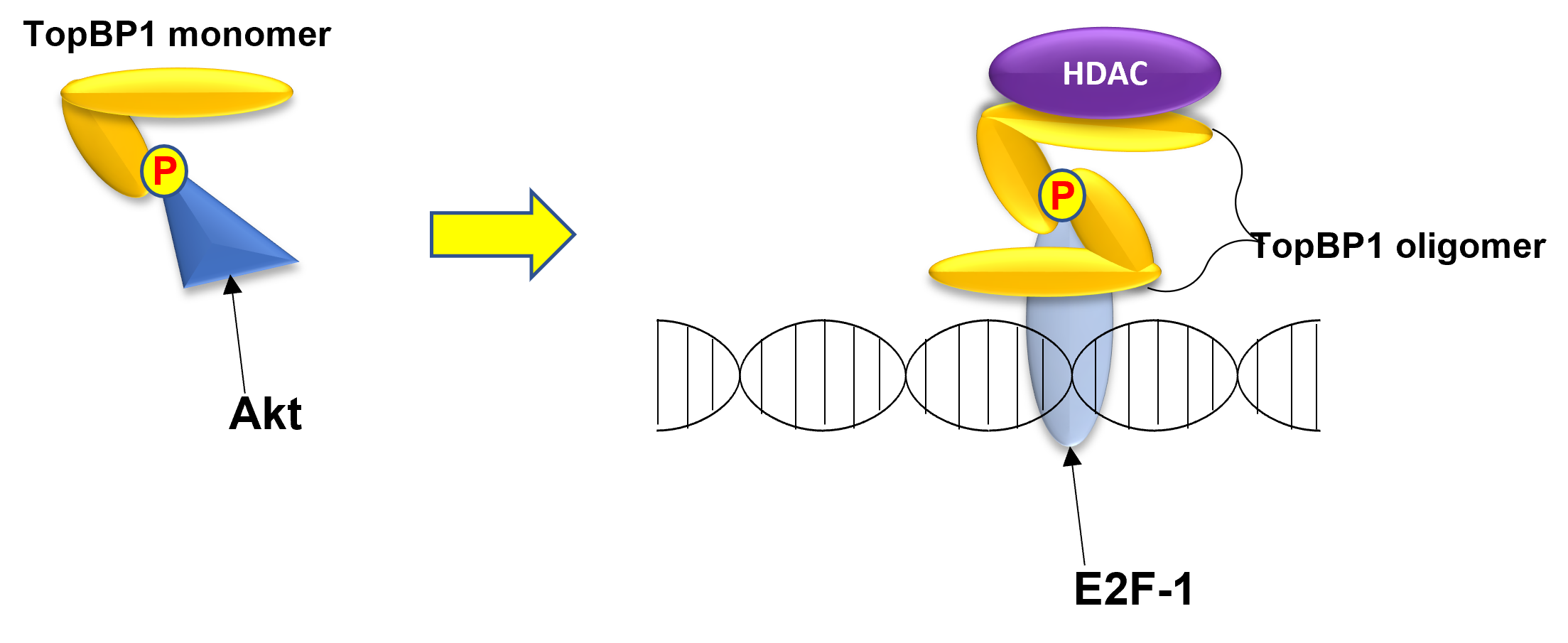
Following DNA damage, TOPBP1 is phosphorylated by Akt and self oligomerizes at the BRCT7/8 domains. Oligomeric TOPBP1 can bind to E2F-1 and recruit chromatin remodeling machinery (e.g. HDAC) to repress E2F-1 driven gene expression.

TOPBP1 regulates gene transcription through its direct interactions with transcription factors, e.g. E2F-1 and Miz1. The E2F family of transcription factors mediate the expression of a multitude of genes involved in a variety of functions. These include cell proliferation, development, DNA damage response, and apoptosis. It is heavily implicated in the DNA replication pathway through its regulation of genes in the retinoblastoma (Rb) tumor suppressor pathway. One such example is E2F-1, which mediates the transition from G1 to S phase. When DNA damage is detected, TOPBP1 will bind to E2F-1 through its BRCT6 domain. This will inhibit the ability of E2F-1 to both induce transcription mediated apoptosis and the transition to S phase. The induction of a repressive transcriptional state in apoptotic related genes is thought to be from the TOPBP1 mediated recruitment of chromatin remodeling machines, e.g. histone deacetylases (HDAC). TOPBP1 binding to E2F-1 is dependent on both Akt mediated phosphorylation of Ser1159 on TOPBP1 and TOPBP1 oligomerization at its 7 and 8 BRCT domains.

=== Cell cycle ===
Replication stress occurs when the replication fork stalls and is unable to progress. This phenomenon may be caused by oncogenic induced activation, difficult to replicate structures, transcription/replication collisions, polymerase uncoupling, dNTP starvation, and other sources. In these instances, cells will progress to mitosis before replication is complete. In an attempt to finish the lingering DNA replication, the cell will initiate mitotic DNA synthesis (MiDAS). TOPBP1 is responsible for recruiting the MiDAS essential scaffolding protein SLX4, which forms a large nuclease complex. The proposed mechanisms for TOPBP1/SLX4 mediated MiDAS are either replication fork restart and/or the resolution of homologous recombination intermediates that were responsible for finishing replication. As mitosis progresses, the amount of DNA associated TOPBP1 decreases, indicative of repaired DNA.

During mitosis, sister chromatids can become entangled and are unable to be separated as normal anaphase commences. These entangled structures are referred to as chromatin bridges and if left unresolved, they can lead to aneuploidy. A specific subset of these entangled chromatids are ultrafine anaphase bridges (UFBs). They are characterized by a lack of histones and an inability to be detected by conventional DNA staining methods. There is evidence that topoisomerase II-α (TOP2A) is capable of resolving UFBs at the centromere, as depletion of TOP2A leads to more UFBs following mitosis. These centromeric UFBs are normally found during mitosis but will decrease as the cell cycle progresses normally. This suggests that UFBs are a normal outcome of mitosis and that TOP2A may play a role in resolving them before the cell exits the cell cycle thereby preventing adverse outcomes TOPBP1 was found to localize to both UFBs and co-localize with TOP2A, which is a conserved interaction found in the yeast homologue Dpb11. As TOPBP1 is a known scaffolding protein, it appears to be recruiting TOP2A to the UFBs for their eventual resolution. TOPBP1 binding to UFBs was found to act through the highly conserved lysine 704 residue in the BRCT5 domain. However it is still not known exactly how TOPBP1 then recruits TOP2A to the UFBs. It has been shown that the BRCT7/8 domains of TOPBP1 interact with TOP2A, but these domains are not found in the yeast homologue Dpb11, so it is hypothesized that the linker region found between BRCT7 and BRCT8 may be responsible for TOP2A recruitment.

== Clinical significance ==
=== Cancer ===
Changes in TOPBP1 gene expression are associated with breast cancer, glioblastoma, non-small cell lung cancer, and sarcomas. In one study, increased TOPBP1 protein levels were found in 46 of 79 (58.2%) of primary breast cancer samples assessed, with this increase in expression associated with a decrease in patient survival (40 vs. 165 months; p = 0.003) and an increase in the histological grade of the cancer (66.7% vs. 35.5% grade; p = 0.007). In healthy breast tissue, TOPBP1 protein expression was only detectable in 2 of 47 (4.26%) samples collected. In contrast to this finding, another study found a decrease in the gene expression of TOPBP1 by RT-PCR in 127 breast cancer patients. Although the TOPBP1 protein expression was unchanged in this cohort. In addition, this study found that TOPBP1 was aberrantly expressed in the cytoplasm in this cohort of familial breast cancer patients. The levels of cytoplasmic TOPBP1 was positively correlated with the histological grade of the tumor.

TOPBP1 overexpression is associated with advanced stage sarcomas, lung metastasis, and chemoresistance to platinum agents (e.g. cisplatin).

A heterozygous polymorphism in TOPBP1 (Arg309Cys mutation between BRCT2 and BRCT3) was found in a cohort of 125 Finnish breast and/or ovarian cancer bearing families (15.2% had the mutation, 7% of controls had the mutation). Although a larger cohort study of German breast cancer patients did not find an association between this polymorphism and risk of breast cancer.

=== Pulmonary hypertension ===
Utilizing publicly available datasets of whole-exome sequencing, a link was found between TOPBP1 mutations and pulmonary hypertension (PAH). Three PAH specific TOPBP1 mutant alleles were identified: p.S817L, p.N1042S, and p.R309C. While the p.R309C allele was predicted to be potentially disease causing, all three disease associated alleles still had high frequencies in the control population, so TOPBP1 mutations would not likely be the only cause of PAH. In follow up studies, knockdown of TOPBP1 by siRNA led to an increase in detectable DNA damage and apoptosis in healthy pulmonary endothelial cells. A rescue with TOPBP1 bearing plasmids led to a recovery in endothelial cell health. This implicates DNA damage in the pathology of PAH.

== See also ==
- DNA damage repair
- Ataxia-telangiectasia mutated and RAD3-related (ATR)
- BRCA1
- DNA replication
- Chromatin bridges
- Topoisomerase II-α (TOP2A)
