= SFI1 =

Protein-coding gene in the species Homo sapiens

Identifiers
- Aliases: SFI1, PISD, PPP1R139, hSfi1p, SFI1 centrin binding protein
- External IDs: OMIM: 612765; MGI: 1926137; GeneCards: SFI1
Available structures
PDB	Ortholog search: PDBe RCSB
PDB	List of PDB id codes 2K2I

Gene location (Human)
Chr.	Chromosome 22 (human)
Band	22q12.2	Start	31,488,688 bp
Band	22q12.2	End	31,618,588 bp

Gene location (Mouse)
Chr.	Chromosome 11 (mouse)
Band	11|11 A1	Start	3,081,850 bp
Band	11|11 A1	End	3,143,463 bp
RNA expression pattern
Bgee	Human / Mouse (ortholog); Top expressed in: right hemisphere of cerebellum; right uterine tube; granulocyte; left testis; anterior pituitary; right testis; sural nerve; spleen; right lobe of thyroid gland; left lobe of thyroid gland / Top expressed in: bronchus; trachea; lobar bronchus; spermatocyte; superior frontal gyrus; mesothelium of visceral serous pericardium; primary visual cortex; yolk sac; Rostral migratory stream; right ventricle; More reference expression data
BioGPS	n/a
Gene ontology
Molecular function	phosphatase binding; protein binding
Cellular component	cytoplasm; centriole; cytosol; centrosome; cytoskeleton
Biological process	negative regulation of phosphatase activity; G2/M transition of mitotic cell cycle; ciliary basal body-plasma membrane docking; regulation of G2/M transition of mitotic cell cycle
Sources:Amigo / QuickGO
Orthologs
Databases	NCBI: entry; OMA: entry
Species	Human	Mouse
Entrez	9814	78887
Ensembl	ENSG00000198089	ENSMUSG00000023764
UniProt	A8K8P3	Q3UZY0
RefSeq (mRNA)	NM_001007467; NM_001258325; NM_001258326; NM_001258327; NM_014775	NM_030207; NM_001363222; NM_001363223; NM_001363224
RefSeq (protein)	NP_001007468; NP_001245254; NP_001245255; NP_001245256; NP_055590	NP_084483; NP_001350151; NP_001350152; NP_001350153
Location (UCSC)	Chr 22: 31.49 – 31.62 Mb	Chr 11: 3.08 – 3.14 Mb
PubMed search
- Wikidata
View/Edit Human	View/Edit Mouse

Sfi1 homolog, spindle assembly associated (yeast) is a protein that in humans is encoded by the SFI1 gene. It localizes to the centriole, and its S. pombe ortholog has been shown to be involved in spindle pole body duplication. SFI1 forms a complex with centrin 2.
