= CIP2A =

Protein-coding gene in the species Homo sapiens

Identifiers
- Aliases: CIP2A, C330027C09Rik, AA408511, AU018569, Cip2a, Kiaa1524, p90, KIAA1524, cell proliferation regulating inhibitor of protein phosphatase 2A, cellular inhibitor of PP2A, NOCIVA
- External IDs: OMIM: 610643; MGI: 2146335; GeneCards: CIP2A

Gene location (Human)
Chr.	Chromosome 3 (human)
Band	3q13.13	Start	108,549,864 bp
Band	3q13.13	End	108,589,644 bp

Gene location (Mouse)
Chr.	Chromosome 16 (mouse)
Band	16|16 B5	Start	48,814,548 bp
Band	16|16 B5	End	48,840,072 bp
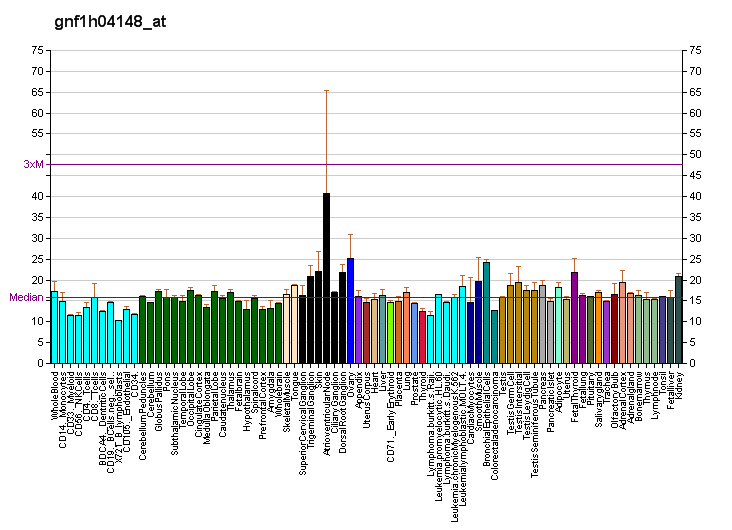

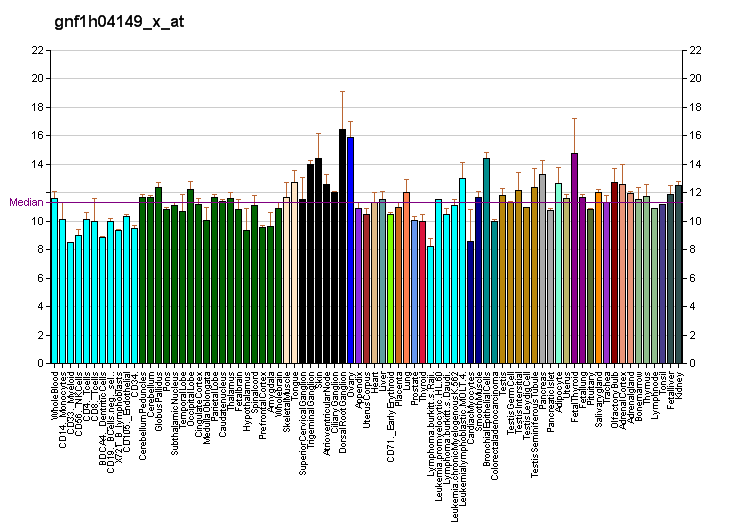

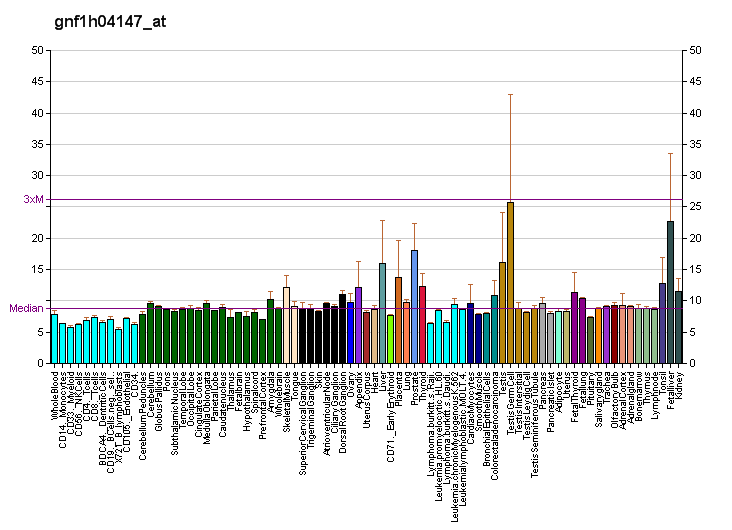
RNA expression pattern
Bgee	Human / Mouse (ortholog); Top expressed in: ventricular zone; secondary oocyte; gonad; testicle; ganglionic eminence; buccal mucosa cell; bone marrow cell; appendix; stromal cell of endometrium; rectum / Top expressed in: genital tubercle; tail of embryo; ventricular zone; primitive streak; abdominal wall; cumulus cell; zygote; secondary oocyte; epiblast; dermis; More reference expression data
BioGPS	More reference expression data
Gene ontology
Molecular function	protein binding; cadherin binding; protein homodimerization activity
Cellular component	integral component of membrane; plasma membrane; membrane; cytoplasm; cytosol
Biological process	positive regulation of neural precursor cell proliferation; spermatogenesis
Sources:Amigo / QuickGO
Orthologs
Databases	NCBI: entry; OMA: entry
Species	Human	Mouse
Entrez	57650	224171
Ensembl	ENSG00000163507	ENSMUSG00000033031
UniProt	Q8TCG1	Q8BWY9
RefSeq (mRNA)	NM_020890	NM_172616
RefSeq (protein)	NP_065941	NP_766204
Location (UCSC)	Chr 3: 108.55 – 108.59 Mb	Chr 16: 48.81 – 48.84 Mb
PubMed search
- Wikidata
View/Edit Human	View/Edit Mouse

Protein CIP2A also known as cancerous inhibitor of PP2A (CIP2A) is a protein that in humans is encoded by the KIAA1524 gene.

CIP2A is a regulatory protein involved in the inhibition of the serine-threonine phosphatase activity of Protein phosphatase 2A (PP2A). PP2A is a trimeric enzyme composed of a catalytic C-subunit, a scaffolding A-subunit, and various regulatory B-subunits, which collectively dephosphorylate a vast majority of cellular serine/threonine phosphorylated proteins, including many involved in cancer progression. CIP2A has been shown to regulate phosphorylation and activity of numerous oncoproteins, promoting malignant cell growth and tumorigenesis in various human cancers. High expression levels of CIP2A have been observed in multiple cancer types, such as head and neck cancer, colon cancer, gastric cancer, breast cancer, prostate cancer, and lung cancer, correlating with poor patient prognosis and disease aggressivity. Additionally, CIP2A is implicated in resistance to cancer treatments, such as imatinib in chronic myeloid leukemia.

== Function ==
Protein phosphatase 2A (PP2A) is a trimeric serine-threonine phosphatase consisting of a catalytic C-subunit (PP2Ac), a scaffolding A-subunit and various regulatory B-subunits. Importantly, it has been estimated that collectively PP2A complexes can dephosphorylate a vast majority of all cellular serine/threonine phosphorylated proteins including large number of phosphoproteins involved in cancer maintenance and progression. The functional role of PP2A as a human tumor suppressor was validated by studies initiated by the Weinberg laboratory, which demonstrated that normal human cells immortalized by overexpression of TERT and inhibition of p53 and Rb, could not be transformed by oncogenic forms of H-Ras without simultaneous inhibition of PP2A activity. Increased activity of oncogenic kinases is not sufficient to drive human cell transformation if PP2A activity is not simultaneously inhibited. In striking contrast to the tumor suppressor p53, which in human tumors is mainly inactivated by mutations, PP2A complex proteins are mutated at low frequency and rather seem to be inhibited by overexpression of PP2A inhibitor proteins such as CIP2A, PME-1 and SET.

=== Role in meiosis ===
A unique feature of meiosis in female mammals, not seen in other cell types, is the characteristic prolonged arrest during the prophase stage of meiosis I. Specifically in oocytes, DNA double-strand breaks can be repaired during meiosis I by a mechanism involving microtubule-dependent recruitment from spindle pole to chromosomes of a protein complex composed of CIP2A (the protein encoded by KIAA1524 gene), MDC1 and TOPBP1.

== Clinical significance ==
CIP2A has been shown to regulate phosphorylation and activity of many other oncoproteins and to drive malignant cell growth and tumorigenesis in various human cancer types. In a recent phosphoproteome study CIP2A depletion was shown to induce dephosphorylation of more than a hundred phosphorylation sites in proteins that were involved in a wide range of cellular functions. This and other published data indicate that CIP2A's role in cancer is linked to many other targets beyond MYC and that CIP2A has important roles in many cellular processes. One example of a recently identified CIP2A regulated phosphoprotein is PKM2. CIP2A was shown in that study to promote PKM2 tetramer formation and oxidative phosphorylation in non-small cell lung cancer. Importantly, CIP2A deficient mice are viable and do not display any life-threatening spontaneous phenotypes, suggesting that targeting of oncogenic function of CIP2A would not result in serious side-effects.

CIP2A is over-expressed in several common human malignancies including human head and neck squamous cell carcinoma (HNSCC), colon cancer, gastric cancer, breast cancer, prostate cancer, and lung cancer. Notably, in these cancer types CIP2A over-expression is observed with very high frequency; in breast cancer around 40% of cancer patients are over-expressing CIP2A whereas in all other studied cancer types the frequency is between 65 and 87%. In breast cancer, CIP2A expression correlates with disease aggressivity whereas in gastric and lung cancer CIP2A expression predicts poor patient survival. To date, high CIP2A expression has been observed to predict poor patient prognosis in more than a dozen human cancer types, which makes it one of the most frequently altered human oncoproteins with clinical relevance.

CIP2A is also over-expressed in prostate cancer, lung cancer, oral squamous cell carcinoma, and gastric cancer. Furthermore, the expression of CIP2A correlates with breast cancer aggressivity. It is also implicated in some Chronic Myeloid Leukemia (CML) resistance to imatinib (Gleevec).

== History ==
In a search for potential non-genetic mechanisms that could inhibit PP2A in human cancer cells, the Westermarck laboratory at the University of Turku (Turku, Finland) used affinity purification coupled with mass spectrometry proteomics (AP-MS) to identify interaction partners for the A-subunit of PP2A. In this PP2A protein complex, they identified a known PP2A inhibitor protein PME1 and a protein named p90 (gene KIAA1524), which the laboratory of Edward Chan at The Scripps Research Institute (La Jolla, California, US) had recently reported to be overexpressed in a small number of gastric cancer patient samples. No function for this protein had been reported.

In their study, Junttila, Puustinen, and co-workers demonstrated that CIP2A inhibits PP2A activity towards the oncogenic transcription factor c-Myc, thereby preventing c-Myc proteolytic degradation. CIP2A was required for malignant cellular growth and in vivo tumor formation. Overexpression of CIP2A promotes Ras-elicited cell growth and transforms immortalized human cells (HEK-TERVs). CIP2A was also shown to be overexpressed in human and mouse head and neck squamous cell carcinoma (HNSCC) as well as human colon cancer. Based on these characteristics, the protein was renamed as cancerous inhibitor of PP2A (CIP2A).
