= Karyogamy =

Fusion of the nuclei of two haploid eukaryotic cells

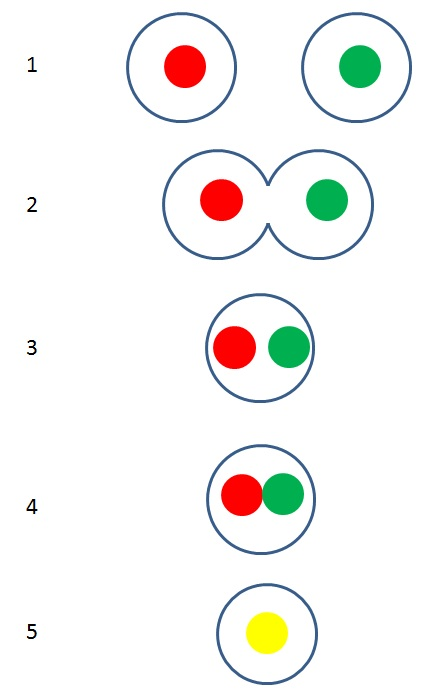
Karyogamy in the context of cell fusion. 1-haploid cells, 2-cell fusion, 3-single cell with two pronuclei, 4-fusing pronuclei (karyogamy), 5-diploid cell

Karyogamy is the final step in the process of fusing together two haploid eukaryotic cells, and refers specifically to the fusion of the two nuclei. Before karyogamy, each haploid cell has one complete copy of the organism's genome. In order for karyogamy to occur, the cell membrane and cytoplasm of each cell must fuse with the other in a process known as plasmogamy. Once within the joined cell membrane, the nuclei are referred to as pronuclei. Once the cell membranes, cytoplasm, and pronuclei fuse, the resulting single cell is diploid, containing two copies of the genome. This diploid cell, called a zygote or zygospore can then enter meiosis (a process of chromosome duplication, recombination, and division, to produce four new haploid cells), or continue to divide by mitosis. Mammalian fertilization uses a comparable process to combine haploid sperm and egg cells (gametes) to create a diploid fertilized egg.

The term karyogamy comes from the Greek karyo- (from κάρυον karyon) 'nut' and γάμος gamos 'marriage'.

== Importance in haploid organisms ==
Step labeled number 4 indicates karyogamy's place in the context of the life cycle of the fungus Taphrina.

Haploid organisms such as fungi, yeast, and algae can have complex cell cycles, in which the choice between sexual or asexual reproduction is fluid, and often influenced by the environment. Some organisms, in addition to their usual haploid state, can also exist as diploid for a short time, allowing genetic recombination to occur. Karyogamy can occur within either mode of reproduction: during the sexual cycle or in somatic (non-reproductive) cells.

Thus, karyogamy is the key step in bringing together two sets of different genetic material which can recombine during meiosis. In haploid organisms that lack sexual cycles, karyogamy can also be an important source of genetic variation during the process of forming somatic diploid cells. Formation of somatic diploids circumvents the process of gamete formation during the sexual reproduction cycle and instead creates variation within the somatic cells of an already developed organism, such as a fungus.

== Role in sexual reproduction ==
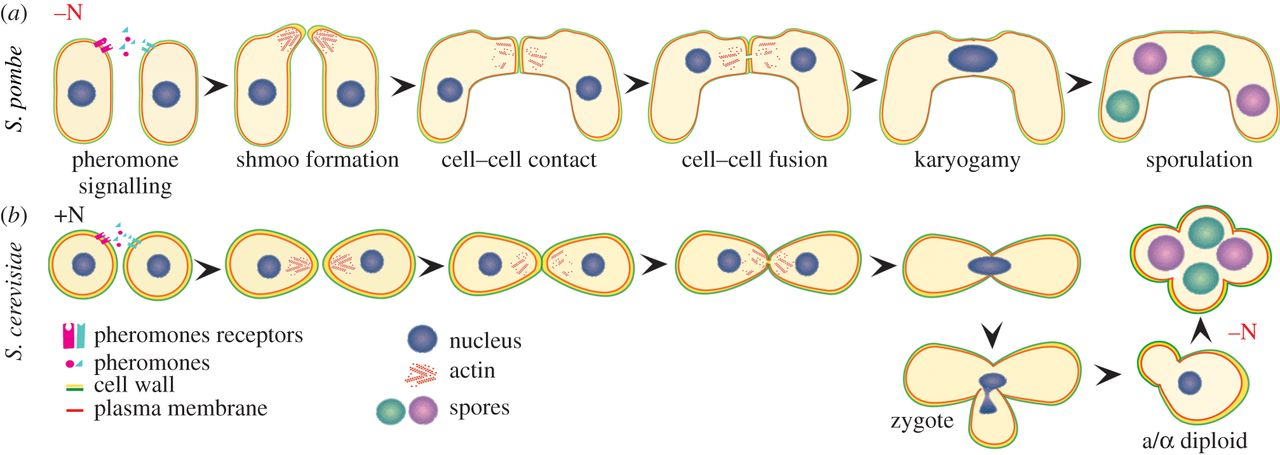
(a) In fission yeast, the mating process is triggered by nitrogen starvation when compatible partners are present. (b) Budding yeast cells of opposite mating type can instead mate spontaneously on rich medium to form stable diploids that undergo sporulation upon starvation. In both organisms after pheromone exchange, cells grow in a polarized manner in the direction of their partner and undergo fusion, karyogamy and sporulation.

The role of karyogamy in sexual reproduction can be demonstrated most simply by single-celled haploid organisms such as the algae of genus Chlamydomonas or the yeast Saccharomyces cerevisiae. Such organisms exist normally in a haploid state, containing only one set of chromosomes per cell. However, the mechanism remains largely the same among all haploid eukaryotes.

When subjected to environmental stress, such as nitrogen starvation in the case of Chlamydomonas, cells are induced to form gametes. Gamete formation in single-celled haploid organisms such as yeast is called sporulation, resulting in many cellular changes that increase resistance to stress. Gamete formation in multicellular fungi occurs in the gametangia, an organ specialized for such a process, usually by meiosis. When opposite mating types meet, they are induced to leave the vegetative cycle and enter the mating cycle. In yeast, there are two mating types, a and α. In fungi, there can be two, four, or even up to 10,000 mating types, depending on the species. Mate recognition in the simplest eukaryotes is achieved through pheromone signaling, which induces shmoo formation (a projection of the cell) and begins the process of microtubule organization and migration. Pheromones used in mating type recognition are often peptides, but sometimes trisporic acid or other molecules, recognized by cellular receptors on the opposite cell. Notably, pheromone signaling is absent in higher fungi such as mushrooms.

The cell membranes and cytoplasm of these haploid cells then fuse together in a process known as plasmogamy. This results in a single cell with two nuclei, known as pronuclei. The pronuclei then fuse together in a well regulated process known as karyogamy. This creates a diploid cell known as a zygote, or a zygospore, which can then enter meiosis, a process of chromosome duplication, recombination, and cell division, to create four new haploid gamete cells. One possible advantage of sexual reproduction is that it results in more genetic variability, providing the opportunity for adaptation through natural selection. Another advantage is efficient recombinational repair of DNA damages during meiosis. Thus, karyogamy is the key step in bringing together a variety of genetic material in order to ensure recombination in meiosis.

The Amoebozoa is a large group of mostly single-celled species that have recently been determined to have the machinery for karyogamy and meiosis. Since the Amoeboza branched off early from the eukaryotic family tree, this finding suggests that karyogamy and meiosis were present early in eukaryotic evolution.

== Cellular mechanisms ==
=== Pronuclear migration ===
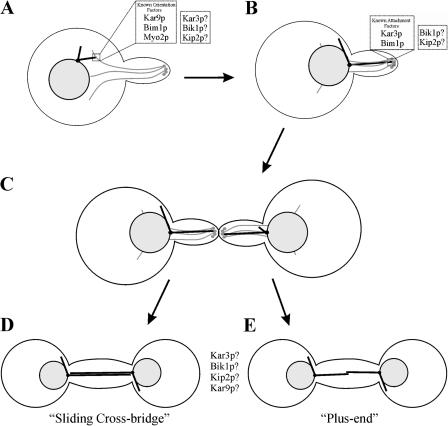
Nucleus is gray; Spindle pole body (SPB) is black circle; Microtubules (MTs) are black bars; actin filaments are gray cables; actin patches are small gray circles. (A) Nuclear orientation to the shmoo tip. (B) MT attachment to the shmoo tip. (C) Before cell–cell fusion, MTs are maintained at the shmoo tip. (D) Sliding cross-bridge model for nuclear congression. Oppositely oriented MTs overlap and are cross-linked along their lengths, whereas depolymerization is induced at the spindle poles. (E) Plus end model for nuclear congression. MT plus ends cross-link and induce depolymerization to draw opposing nuclei together.

The ultimate goal of karyogamy is fusion of the two haploid nuclei. The first step in this process is the movement of the two pronuclei toward each other, which occurs directly after plasmogamy. Each pronucleus has a spindle pole body that is embedded in the nuclear envelope and serves as an attachment point for microtubules. Microtubules, an important fiber-like component of the cytoskeleton, emerge at the spindle pole body. The attachment point to the spindle pole body marks the minus end, and the plus end extends into the cytoplasm. The plus end has normal roles in mitotic division, but during nuclear congression, the plus ends are redirected. The microtubule plus ends attach to the opposite pronucleus, resulting in the pulling of the two pronuclei toward each other.

Microtubule movement is mediated by a family of motor proteins known as kinesins, such as Kar3 in yeast. Accessory proteins, such as Spc72 in yeast, act as a glue, connecting the motor protein, spindle pole body and microtubule in a structure known as the half-bridge. Other proteins, such as Kar9 and Bim1 in yeast, attach to the plus end of the microtubules. They are activated by pheromone signals to attach to the shmoo tip. A shmoo is a projection of the cellular membrane which is the site of initial cell fusion in plasmogamy. After plasmogamy, the microtubule plus ends continue to grow towards the opposite pronucleus. It is thought that the growing plus end of the microtubule attaches directly to the motor protein of the opposite pronucleus, triggering a reorganization of the proteins at the half-bridge. The force necessary for migration occurs directly in response to this interaction.

Two models of nuclear congression have been proposed: the sliding cross-bridge, and the plus end model. In the sliding cross-bridge model, the microtubules run antiparallel to each other for the entire distance between the two pronuclei, forming cross-links to each other, and each attaching to the opposite nucleus at the plus end. This is the favored model. The alternative model proposes that the plus ends contact each other midway between the two pronuclei and only overlap slightly. In either model, it is believed that microtubule shortening occurs at the plus end and requires Kar3p (in yeast), a member of a family of kinesin-like proteins.

Microtubule organization in the cytoskeleton has been shown to be essential for proper nuclear congression during karyogamy. Defective microtubule organization causes total failure of karyogamy, but does not totally interrupt meiosis and spore production in yeast. The failure occurs because the process of nuclear congression cannot occur without functional microtubules. Thus, the pronuclei do not approach close enough to each other to fuse together, and their genetic material remains separated.

=== Pronuclear fusion (karyogamy) ===
Merging of the nuclear envelopes of the pi occurs in three steps: fusion of the outer membrane, fusion of the inner membrane, and fusion of the spindle pole bodies. In yeast, several members of the Kar family of proteins, as well as a protamine, are required for the fusion of nuclear membranes. The protamine Prm3 is located on the outer surface of each nuclear membrane, and is required for the fusion of the outer membrane. The exact mechanism is not known. Kar5, a kinesin-like protein, is necessary to expand the distance between the outer and inner membranes in a phenomenon known as bridge expansion. Kar8 and Kar2 are thought to be necessary to the fusing of the inner membranes. As described above, the reorganization of accessory and motor proteins during pronuclear migration also serves to orient the spindle pole bodies in the correct direction for efficient nuclear congression. Nuclear congression can still take place without this pre-orientation of spindle pole bodies, but it is slower. Ultimately the two pronuclei combine the contents of their nucleoplasms and form a single envelope around the result.

== Role in somatic diploids ==
Although fungi are normally haploid, diploid cells can arise by two mechanisms. The first is a failure of the mitotic spindle during regular cell division, and does not involve karyogamy. The resulting cell can only be genetically homozygous since it is produced from one haploid cell. The second mechanism, involving karyogamy of somatic cells, can produce heterozygous diploids if the two nuclei differ in genetic information. The formation of somatic diploids is generally rare, and is thought to occur because of a mutation in the karyogamy repressor gene (KR).

There are, however, a few fungi that exist mostly in the diploid state. One example is Candida albicans, a fungus that lives in the gastrointestinal tracts of many warm blooded animals, including humans. Although usually innocuous, C. albicans can turn pathogenic and is a particular problem in immunosuppressed patients. Unlike with most other fungi, diploid cells of different mating types fuse to create tetraploid cells which subsequently return to the diploid state by losing chromosomes.

== Similarities to and differences from mammalian fertilization ==
Mammals, including humans, also combine genetic material from two sources - father and mother - in fertilization. This process is similar to karyogamy. As with karyogamy, microtubules play an important part in fertilization and are necessary for the joining of the sperm and egg (oocyte) DNA. Drugs such as griseofulvin that interfere with microtubules prevent the fusion of the sperm and egg pronuclei. The gene KAR2 which plays a large role in karyogamy has a mammalian analog called Bib/GRP78. In both cases, genetic material is combined to create a diploid cell that has greater genetic diversity than either original source. Instead of fusing in the same way as lower eukaryotes do in karyogamy, the sperm nucleus vesiculates and its DNA decondenses. The sperm centriole acts as a microtubule organizing center and forms an aster which extends throughout the egg until contacting the egg's nucleus. The two pronuclei migrate toward each other and then fuse to form a diploid cell.

== See also ==
- Sexual reproduction
- Polyploid
- Fungi
