= Centrin 2 =

Protein-coding gene in humans

CETN2
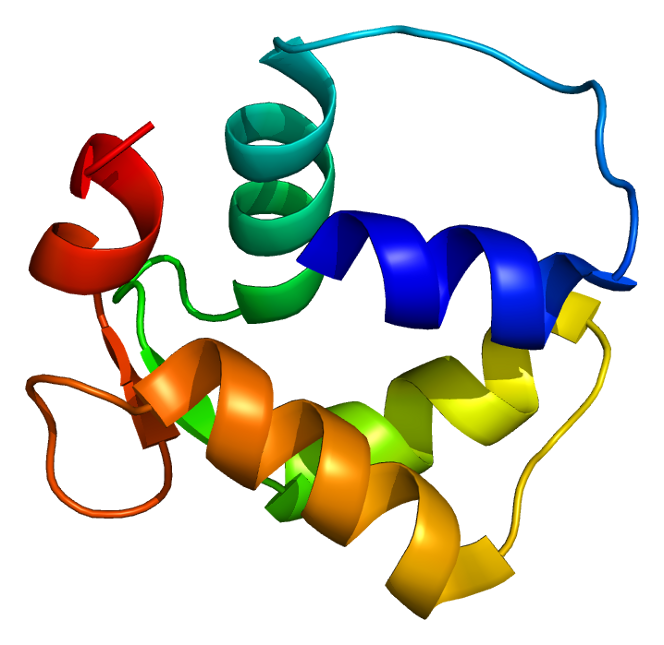

Identifiers
- Aliases: CETN2, CALT, CEN2, centrin 2
- External IDs: OMIM: 300006; MGI: 1347085; GeneCards: CETN2
Available structures
PDB	Ortholog search: PDBe RCSB
PDB	List of PDB id codes 1M39, 1ZMZ, 2A4J, 2GGM, 2K2I, 2OBH

Gene location (Human)
Chr.	X chromosome (human)
Band	Xq28	Start	152,826,994 bp
Band	Xq28	End	152,830,757 bp

Gene location (Mouse)
Chr.	X chromosome (mouse)
Band	X A7.3|X 37.29 cM	Start	71,957,138 bp
Band	X A7.3|X 37.29 cM	End	71,962,017 bp
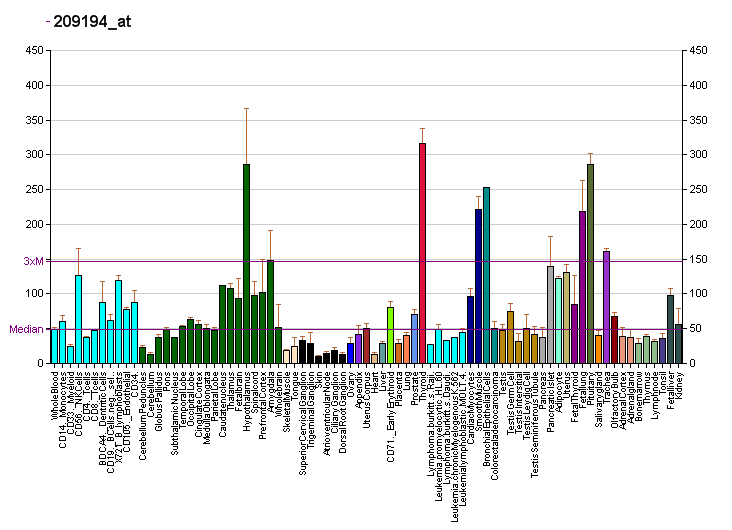
RNA expression pattern
Bgee	Human / Mouse (ortholog); Top expressed in: bronchial epithelial cell; right uterine tube; mucosa of paranasal sinus; caput epididymis; germinal epithelium; olfactory zone of nasal mucosa; corpus epididymis; epithelium of nasopharynx; optic nerve; tail of epididymis / Top expressed in: Epithelium of choroid plexus; vestibular sensory epithelium; atrioventricular valve; endocardial cushion; epithelium of lens; median eminence; condyle; iris; fossa; retinal pigment epithelium; More reference expression data
BioGPS	More reference expression data
Gene ontology
Molecular function	heterotrimeric G-protein binding; metal ion binding; calcium ion binding; G-protein beta/gamma-subunit complex binding; microtubule binding; protein binding
Cellular component	photoreceptor connecting cilium; centriole; cytoplasm; nucleoplasm; ciliary basal body; cytosol; nucleus; XPC complex; centrosome; intracellular anatomical structure; cilium; cytoskeleton; microtubule organizing center; nuclear pore nuclear basket; transcription export complex 2; nuclear envelope; nuclear pore
Biological process	nucleotide-excision repair, DNA damage recognition; cell cycle; spermatogenesis; cell division; G2/M transition of mitotic cell cycle; regulation of cytokinesis; centriole replication; cellular response to DNA damage stimulus; global genome nucleotide-excision repair; nucleotide-excision repair, preincision complex assembly; DNA repair; nucleotide-excision repair; ciliary basal body-plasma membrane docking; mitotic cell cycle; regulation of G2/M transition of mitotic cell cycle; mitotic cytokinesis; regulation of centrosome duplication; calcium-mediated signaling; microtubule cytoskeleton organization; nucleotide-excision repair, DNA duplex unwinding; protein transport; mRNA transport
Sources:Amigo / QuickGO
Orthologs
Databases	NCBI: entry; OMA: entry
Species	Human	Mouse
Entrez	1069	26370
Ensembl	ENSG00000147400	ENSMUSG00000031347
UniProt	P41208	Q9R1K9
RefSeq (mRNA)	NM_004344	NM_019405
RefSeq (protein)	NP_004335	NP_062278
Location (UCSC)	Chr X: 152.83 – 152.83 Mb	Chr X: 71.96 – 71.96 Mb
PubMed search
- Wikidata
View/Edit Human	View/Edit Mouse

Centrin-2 is a protein that in humans is encoded by the CETN2 gene. It belongs to the centrin family of proteins.

Centrin-2 belongs to a family of calcium-binding proteins and is a structural component of the centrosome. The high level of conservation from algae to humans and its association with the centrosome suggested that centrin-2 plays a fundamental role in the structure and function of the microtubule-organizing center, possibly required for the proper duplication and segregation of the centrosome.

== Interactions ==
CETN2 has been shown to interact with XPC and SFI1.
