= ZBTB17 =

Protein-coding gene in humans

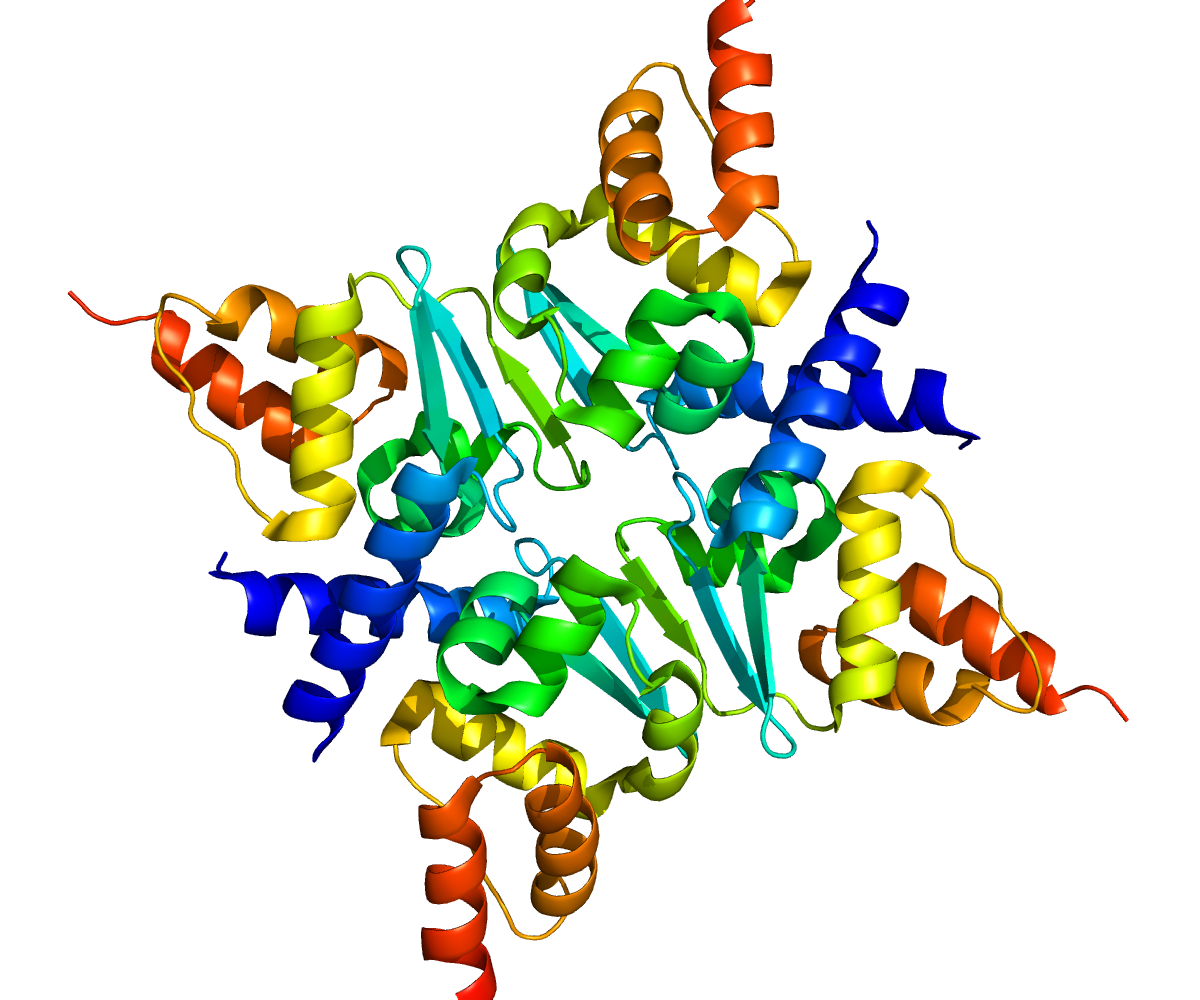

Identifiers
- Aliases: ZBTB17, MIZ-1, ZNF151, ZNF60, pHZ-67, zinc finger and BTB domain containing 17
- External IDs: OMIM: 604084; MGI: 107410; GeneCards: ZBTB17
Available structures
PDB	Ortholog search: PDBe RCSB
PDB	List of PDB id codes 2LVR, 2LVT, 2LVU, 2M0D, 2M0E, 2M0F, 2N25, 2N26, 2Q81, 3M52, 4U2M, 4U2N, 5ION

Gene location (Human)
Chr.	Chromosome 1 (human)
Band	1p36.13	Start	15,941,869 bp
Band	1p36.13	End	15,976,132 bp

Gene location (Mouse)
Chr.	Chromosome 4 (mouse)
Band	4|4 D3	Start	141,171,965 bp
Band	4|4 D3	End	141,195,241 bp
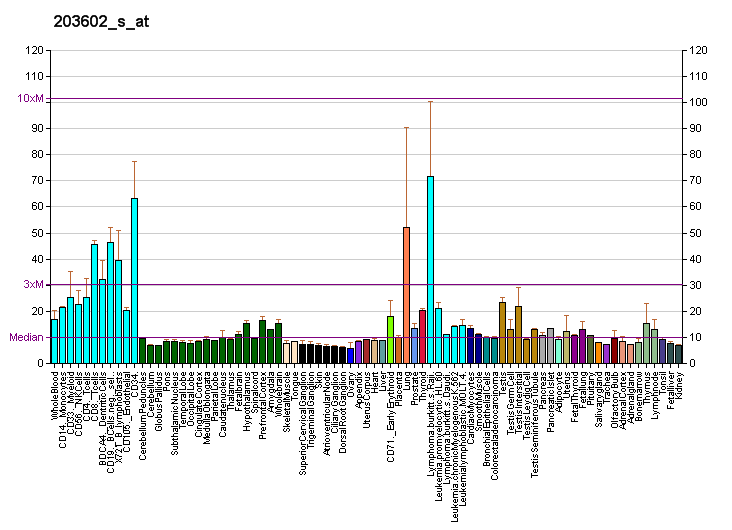

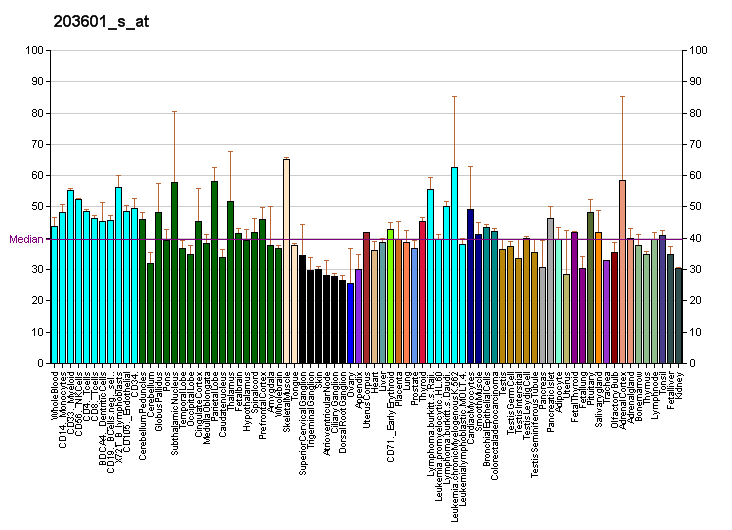
RNA expression pattern
Bgee	Human / Mouse (ortholog); Top expressed in: sural nerve; tendon of biceps brachii; granulocyte; apex of heart; right lobe of thyroid gland; ganglionic eminence; left lobe of thyroid gland; upper lobe of left lung; spleen; ectocervix / Top expressed in: saccule; otic placode; otic vesicle; ventricular zone; plantaris muscle; extensor digitorum longus muscle; muscle of thigh; interventricular septum; soleus muscle; granulocyte; More reference expression data
BioGPS	More reference expression data
Gene ontology
Molecular function	DNA-binding transcription factor activity; DNA binding; protein binding; metal ion binding; nucleic acid binding; RNA polymerase II cis-regulatory region sequence-specific DNA binding; DNA-binding transcription activator activity, RNA polymerase II-specific; transcription coactivator binding; transcription factor binding; DNA-binding transcription factor activity, RNA polymerase II-specific
Cellular component	nucleus; nucleoplasm; protein-DNA complex; protein-containing complex
Biological process	positive regulation of transcription, DNA-templated; multicellular organism development; gastrulation with mouth forming second; ectoderm development; IRE1-mediated unfolded protein response; negative regulation of cell cycle; regulation of transcription, DNA-templated; transcription, DNA-templated; transcription by RNA polymerase II; negative regulation of cell population proliferation; positive regulation of transcription by RNA polymerase II
Sources:Amigo / QuickGO
Orthologs
Databases	NCBI: entry; OMA: entry
Species	Human	Mouse
Entrez	7709	22642
Ensembl	ENSG00000116809	ENSMUSG00000006215
UniProt	Q13105	Q60821
RefSeq (mRNA)	NM_001242884; NM_001287603; NM_001287604; NM_003443; NM_001324137 NM_001324138	NM_009541; NM_001378826; NM_001378827; NM_001378828
RefSeq (protein)	NP_001229813; NP_001274532; NP_001274533; NP_001311066; NP_001311067 NP_003434	NP_033567; NP_001365755; NP_001365756; NP_001365757
Location (UCSC)	Chr 1: 15.94 – 15.98 Mb	Chr 4: 141.17 – 141.2 Mb
PubMed search
- Wikidata
View/Edit Human	View/Edit Mouse

Zinc finger and BTB domain-containing protein 17 is a protein that in humans is encoded by the ZBTB17 gene.

== Interactions ==
ZBTB17 has been shown to interact with TOPBP1, Host cell factor C1 and Myc.
