= TOP2A =

Protein-coding gene in the species Homo sapiens

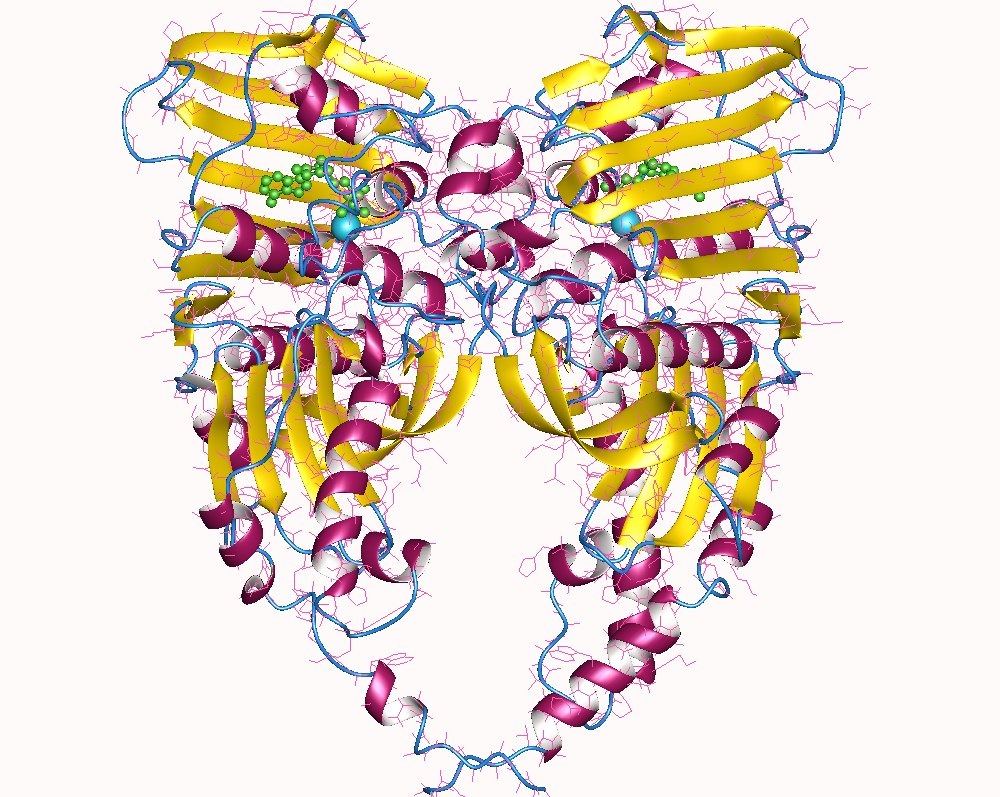

Identifiers
- Aliases: TOP2A, TOP2, TP2A, topoisomerase (DNA) II alpha, DNA topoisomerase II alpha, TOPIIA, TOP2alpha
- External IDs: OMIM: 126430; MGI: 98790; GeneCards: TOP2A
Available structures
PDB	Ortholog search: PDBe RCSB
PDB	List of PDB id codes 1ZXM, 1ZXN, 4FM9, 4R1F
Enzyme activity
EC #	BRENDA	ExPASy	KEGG	MetaCyc
5.6.2.2	↗	↗	↗	↗

Gene location (Human)
Chr.	Chromosome 17 (human)
Band	17q21.2	Start	40,388,525 bp
Band	17q21.2	End	40,417,896 bp

Gene location (Mouse)
Chr.	Chromosome 11 (mouse)
Band	11 D|11 62.91 cM	Start	98,883,769 bp
Band	11 D|11 62.91 cM	End	98,915,015 bp
RNA expression pattern
Bgee	Human / Mouse (ortholog); Top expressed in: ventricular zone; ganglionic eminence; secondary oocyte; right testis; left testis; bone marrow; trabecular bone; gonad; bone marrow cell; testicle / Top expressed in: genital tubercle; tail of embryo; ventricular zone; fetal liver hematopoietic progenitor cell; maxillary prominence; primitive streak; mandibular prominence; epiblast; tibiofemoral joint; somite; More reference expression data
BioGPS	n/a
Gene ontology
Molecular function	DNA binding; nucleotide binding; ATP-dependent activity, acting on DNA; protein homodimerization activity; histone deacetylase binding; chromatin binding; isomerase activity; metal ion binding; DNA topoisomerase activity; protein C-terminus binding; ubiquitin binding; protein binding; protein heterodimerization activity; enzyme binding; ATP binding; protein kinase C binding; magnesium ion binding; DNA binding, bending; RNA binding; DNA topoisomerase type II (double strand cut, ATP-hydrolyzing) activity
Cellular component	cytoplasm; DNA topoisomerase type II (double strand cut, ATP-hydrolyzing) complex; nucleoplasm; nuclear chromosome; nucleolus; centriole; condensed chromosome; nucleus; viral integration complex; protein-containing complex; ribonucleoprotein complex
Biological process	resolution of meiotic recombination intermediates; apoptotic chromosome condensation; embryonic cleavage; rhythmic process; chromosome segregation; DNA metabolic process; protein sumoylation; cellular response to DNA damage stimulus; DNA ligation; chromosome condensation; regulation of circadian rhythm; hematopoietic progenitor cell differentiation; positive regulation of apoptotic process; mitotic DNA integrity checkpoint signaling; positive regulation of viral genome replication; positive regulation of single stranded viral RNA replication via double stranded DNA intermediate; sister chromatid segregation; positive regulation of transcription by RNA polymerase II; DNA topological change; negative regulation of DNA duplex unwinding; female meiotic nuclear division
Sources:Amigo / QuickGO
Orthologs
Databases	NCBI: entry; OMA: entry
Species	Human	Mouse
Entrez	7153	21973
Ensembl	ENSG00000131747	ENSMUSG00000020914
UniProt	P11388	Q01320
RefSeq (mRNA)	NM_001067	NM_011623
RefSeq (protein)	NP_001058	NP_035753
Location (UCSC)	Chr 17: 40.39 – 40.42 Mb	Chr 11: 98.88 – 98.92 Mb
PubMed search
- Wikidata
View/Edit Human	View/Edit Mouse

DNA topoisomerase IIα is a human enzyme encoded by the TOP2A gene.

Topoisomerase IIα relieves topological DNA stress during transcription, condenses chromosomes, and separates chromatids. It catalyzes the transient breaking and rejoining of two strands of duplex DNA which allows the strands to pass through one another. Two forms of this enzyme exist as likely products of a gene duplication event. The gene encoding this form, alpha, is localized to chromosome 17 and the beta gene is localized to chromosome 3. The gene encoding this enzyme functions as the target for several chemotherapy agents and a variety of mutations in this gene have been associated with the development of drug resistance. Reduced activity of this enzyme may also play a role in ataxia-telangiectasia.

== Interactions ==
TOP2A has been shown to interact with SMURF2, HDAC1, CDC5L, Small ubiquitin-related modifier 1, P53, and TOPBP1.

== In other species ==
In Drosophila Hadlaczky et al 1988 found DNA topoisomerase II α to correlate with cell proliferation - but β did not.

== See also ==
- Topoisomerase II
- TOP2B - Topoisomerase II beta
- Gene duplication
- Ataxia-telangiectasia
- TOPBP1
