= TOP2B =

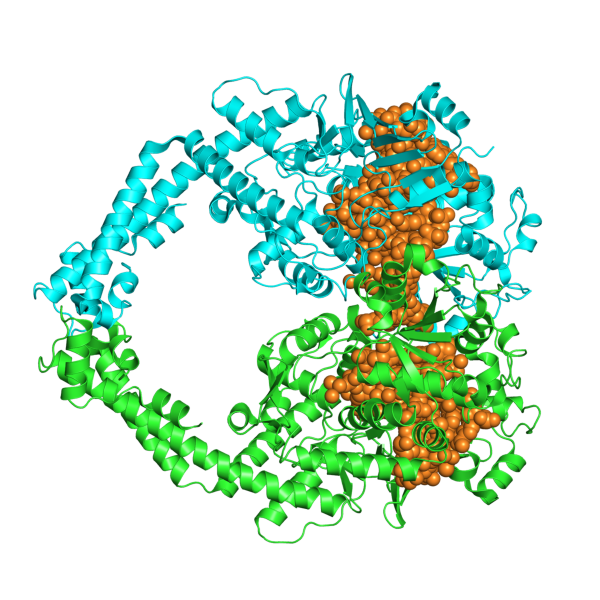

Identifiers
- Aliases: TOP2B, TOPIIB, top2beta, topoisomerase (DNA) II beta, DNA topoisomerase II beta, BILU
- External IDs: OMIM: 126431; MGI: 98791; GeneCards: TOP2B
Available structures
PDB	Ortholog search: PDBe RCSB
PDB	List of PDB id codes 3QX3, 4G0U, 4G0V, 4G0W, 4J3N
Enzyme activity
EC #	BRENDA	ExPASy	KEGG	MetaCyc
5.6.2.2	↗	↗	↗	↗

Gene location (Human)
Chr.	Chromosome 3 (human)
Band	3p24.2	Start	25,597,984 bp
Band	3p24.2	End	25,664,907 bp

Gene location (Mouse)
Chr.	Chromosome 14 (mouse)
Band	14|14 A1	Start	6,034,301 bp
Band	14|14 A1	End	6,104,584 bp
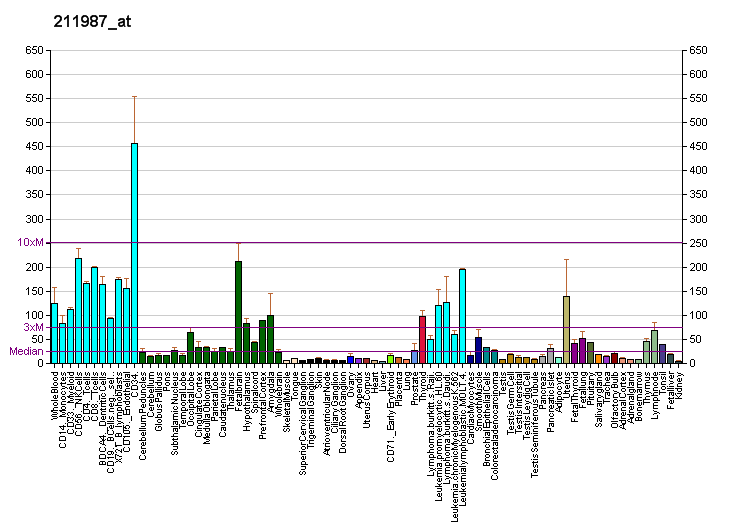
RNA expression pattern
Bgee	Human / Mouse (ortholog); Top expressed in: ganglionic eminence; ventricular zone; endothelial cell; Achilles tendon; cerebellar cortex; cerebellar hemisphere; right hemisphere of cerebellum; retinal pigment epithelium; epithelium of colon; rectum / Top expressed in: ventricular zone; ganglionic eminence; tail of embryo; medial ganglionic eminence; genital tubercle; thymus; abdominal wall; dermis; condyle; lobe of cerebellum; More reference expression data
BioGPS	More reference expression data
Gene ontology
Molecular function	DNA topoisomerase type II (double strand cut, ATP-hydrolyzing) activity; nucleotide binding; DNA binding; histone deacetylase binding; chromatin binding; isomerase activity; metal ion binding; DNA topoisomerase activity; protein C-terminus binding; protein heterodimerization activity; enzyme binding; ATP binding; protein kinase C binding; ribonucleoprotein complex binding
Cellular component	cytosol; nucleoplasm; heterochromatin; nucleolus; nucleus; cytoplasm; ribonucleoprotein complex; viral integration complex
Biological process	resolution of meiotic recombination intermediates; axonogenesis; DNA metabolic process; neuron migration; forebrain development; mitotic DNA integrity checkpoint signaling; sister chromatid segregation; DNA topological change; positive regulation of single stranded viral RNA replication via double stranded DNA intermediate
Sources:Amigo / QuickGO
Orthologs
Databases	NCBI: entry; OMA: entry
Species	Human	Mouse
Entrez	7155	21974
Ensembl	ENSG00000077097	ENSMUSG00000017485
UniProt	Q02880	Q64511
RefSeq (mRNA)	NM_001068; NM_001330700	NM_009409
RefSeq (protein)	NP_001059; NP_001317629	NP_033435
Location (UCSC)	Chr 3: 25.6 – 25.66 Mb	Chr 14: 6.03 – 6.1 Mb
PubMed search
- Wikidata
View/Edit Human	View/Edit Mouse

DNA topoisomerase 2-beta is an enzyme used in DNA transcription that in humans is encoded by the TOP2B gene on chromosome 3.

== Function ==
This gene encodes a DNA topoisomerase, an enzyme that controls and alters the topologic states of DNA during transcription. This nuclear enzyme is involved in processes such as chromosome condensation, chromatid separation, and the relief of torsional stress that occurs during DNA transcription and replication. It catalyzes the transient breaking and rejoining of two strands of duplex DNA which allows the strands to pass through one another, thus altering the topology of DNA. Two forms of this enzyme exist as likely products of a gene duplication event. The gene encoding this form, beta, is localized to chromosome 3 and the alpha form is localized to chromosome 17. The gene encoding this enzyme functions as the target for several anticancer agents, for example mitoxantrone, and a variety of mutations in this gene have been associated with the development of drug resistance. Reduced activity of this enzyme may also play a role in ataxia-telangiectasia. Alternative splicing of this gene results in two transcript variants; however, the second variant has not yet been fully described.

=== Neuronal activity ===
During a new learning experience, a set of genes is rapidly expressed in the brain. This induced gene expression is considered to be essential for processing the information being learned. Such genes are referred to as immediate early genes (IEGs). TOP2B activity is essential for the expression of IEGs in a type of learning experience in mice termed associative fear memory. Such a learning experience appears to rapidly trigger TOP2B to induce double-strand breaks in the promoter DNA of IEG genes that function in neuroplasticity. Repair of these induced breaks is associated with DNA demethylation of IEG gene promoters allowing immediate expression of these IEG genes.

Activation of more than 600 regulatory sequences in promoters and 800 regulatory sequences in enhancers, in many cell types, appears to depend on short-term double-strand breaks initiated by TOP2B. The induction of particular double-strand breaks are specific with respect to their inducing signal. When neurons are activated in vitro, just 22 of TOP2B-induced double-strand breaks occur in their genomes, largely at immediate early genes.

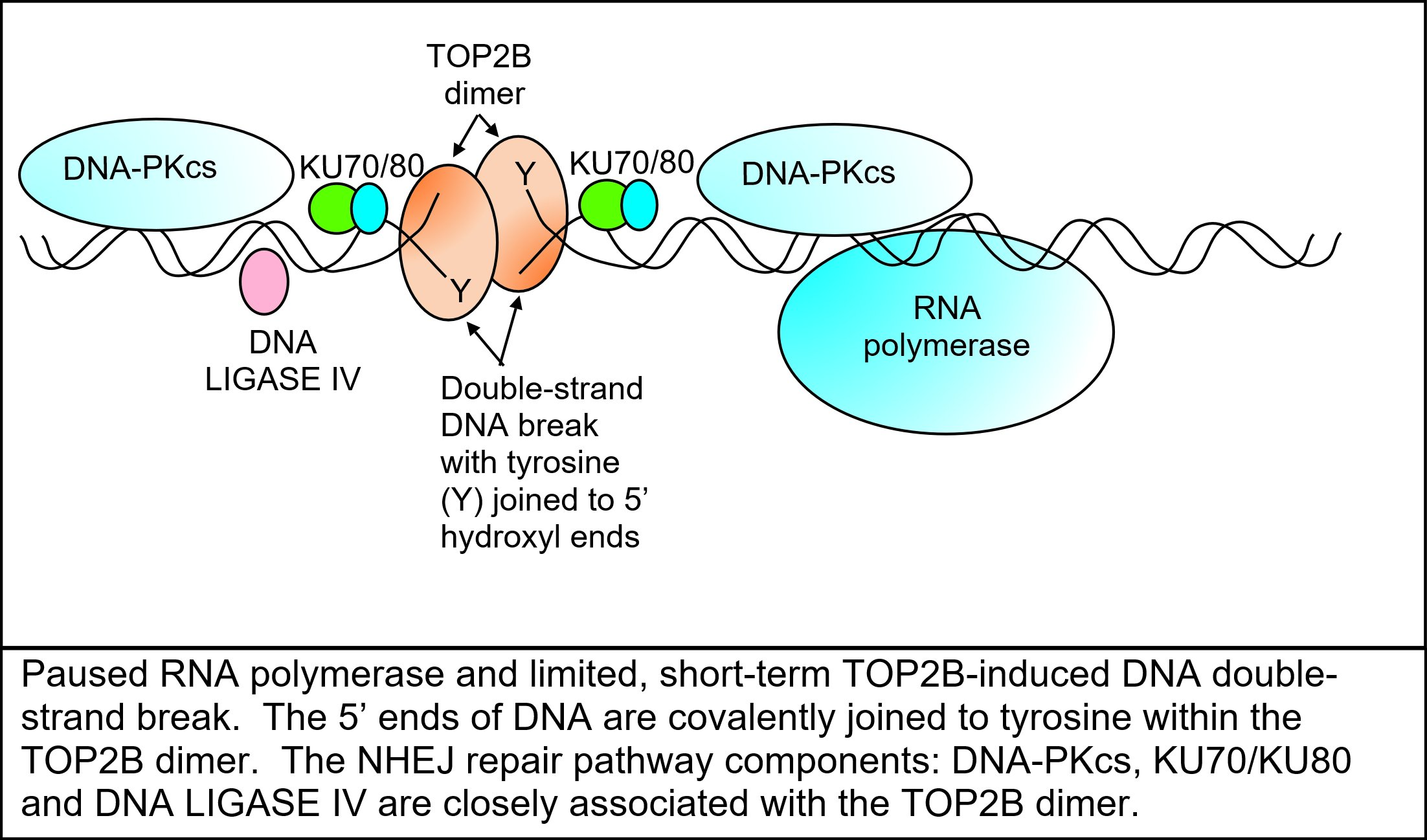

The induction of short-term double-strand breaks by TOP2B occurs in association with at least four enzymes of the non-homologous end joining (NHEJ) DNA repair pathway (DNA-PKcs, KU70, KU80 and DNA LIGASE IV) (see Figure). These enzymes repair the double-strand breaks within about 15 minutes to two hours. The double-strand breaks in the promoter are thus associated with TOP2B and at least these four repair enzymes. These proteins are present simultaneously on a single promoter nucleosome (there are about 147 nucleotides in the DNA sequence wrapped around a single nucleosome) located near the transcription start site of their target gene.

The double-strand break introduced by TOP2B apparently frees a part of the promoter at an RNA polymerase-bound transcription start site to physically move to its associated enhancer (see regulatory sequence). This allows the enhancer, with its bound transcription factors and mediator proteins, to directly interact with the RNA polymerase paused at the transcription start site to start transcription.

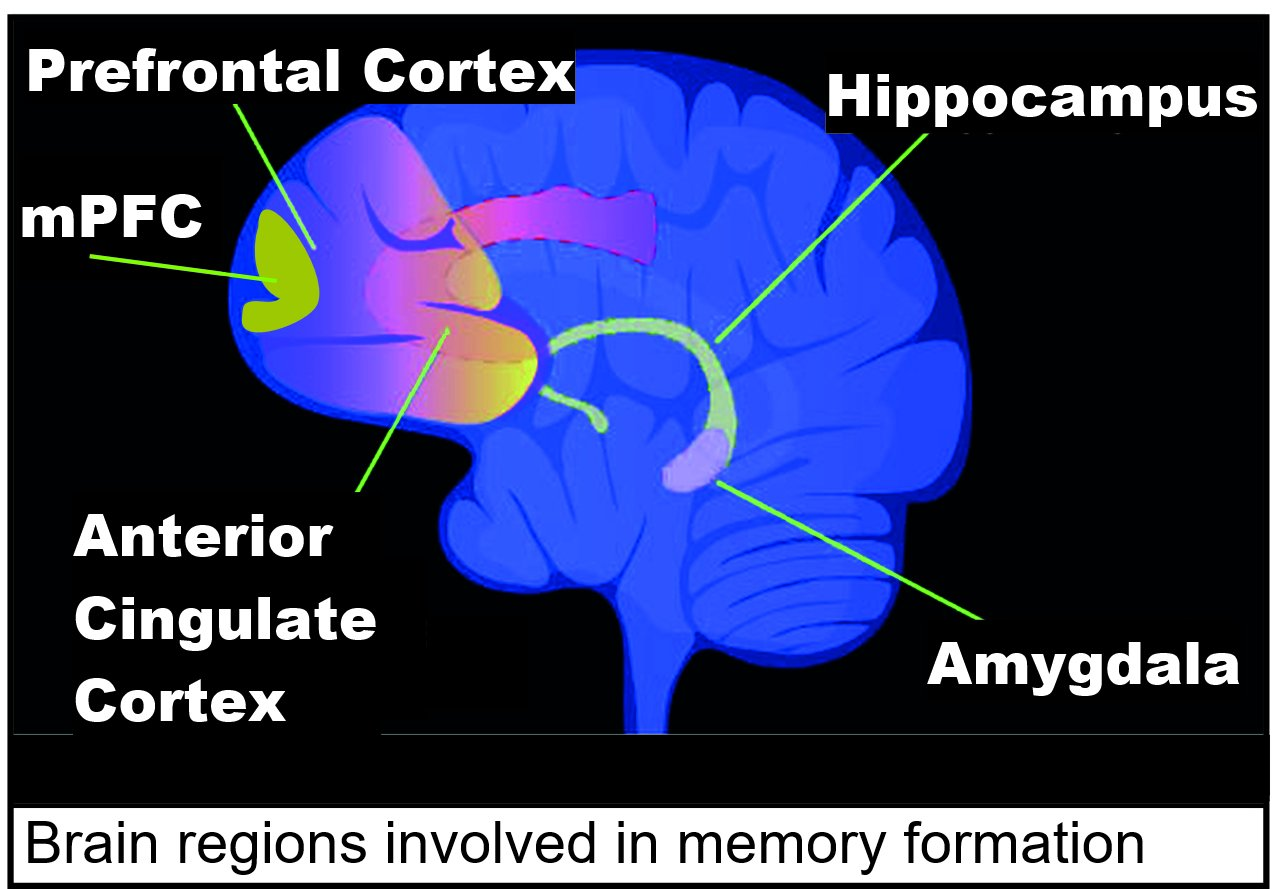
Brain regions involved in memory formation including medial prefrontal cortex (mPFC)

Contextual fear conditioning in the mouse causes the mouse to have a long-term memory and fear of the location in which it occurred. This conditioning causes hundreds of gene-associated DSBs in the medial prefrontal cortex (mPFC) and hippocampus that are important for learning and memory.

=== Other TOP2B and DNA interactions ===
Interactions of TOP2B and DNA also regulate transcription of genes that are important for development. These include genes encoding axon guidance factors and cell adhesion molecules. Specifically, TOP2B is required for lamina-specific targeting of retinal ganglion cell axons and dendrites in the zebrafish.

== Interactions ==
TOP2B has been shown to interact with:

- BAZ1B,
- HDAC1,
- Histone deacetylase 2,
- P53,
- Small ubiquitin-related modifier 1 and
- T-cell surface glycoprotein CD3 epsilon chain.

== In other species ==
In Drosophila Hadlaczky et al. 1988 found DNA topoisomerase II β did not correlate with cell proliferation - while α did.
