= Spindle pole body =

The spindle pole body (SPB) is the microtubule organizing center in yeast cells, functionally equivalent to the centrosome. Unlike the centrosome the SPB does not contain centrioles. The SPB organises the microtubule cytoskeleton which plays many roles in the cell. It is important for organising the spindle and thus in cell division.

== SPB structure in Saccharomyces cerevisiae ==
The molecular mass of a diploid SPB, including microtubules and microtubule associated proteins, is estimated to be 1–1.5 GDa whereas a core SPB is 0.3–0.5 GDa. The SPB is a cylindrical multilayer organelle. These layers are: an outer plaque (OP), which connects to the cytoplasmic microtubules (cMT); a first intermediate layer (IL1) and an electrondense second intermediate layer (IL2); an electrondense central plaque (CP), which is at the level of the nuclear envelope and is connected to it by hook-like structures, an ill-defined inner plaque (IP); and a layer of the inner plaque that contains capped nuclear microtubules (nMT) ends. The central plaque and IL2 appeared as distinct but highly ordered layers. The other layers (MT ends, IP, IL1, and OP) do not show ordered packing. The location of the inner and outer plaques in relation to the nuclear membranes is maintained during the entire cell cycle. One side of the central plaque is associated with an electron-dense region of the nuclear envelope termed the half bridge. The SPB has constant height size (the inner plaque to outer plaque distance) for about 150 nm, but its diameter changes during cell cycle, e.g. in haploid cells, the SPB grows in diameter from 80 nm in G1 to 110 nm in mitosis. The SPB diameter depends on DNA content. A larger SPB diameter increases microtubule nucleation capacity of the SPB, which is important for chromosome segregation.

All SPB proteins can be divided into three groups: core components, half-bridge components and components needed for connection with NE. There is no known motif or structure, that makes a protein belong to SPB, but analysis of known SPB proteins and their genes shows several common features. The core contains mostly proteins with coiled-coil motifs, that allow to form dimers, either with themselves or with others proteins and maintain regular structures (e.g. CP, IL2). Many SPB genes contain MluI cell cycle boxes in their promoter elements that lead to G1 specific gene transcription. The primary sequence of SPB components should contain consensus phosphorylation sites for mitotic kinases, because the SPB is highly phosphorylated.

The main central plaque component is coiled-coil protein Spc42p (for spindle pole body component) also found to be a part of satellite, that forms a core crystal of SPB. The Spc42p protein is involved in initiation of SPB assembly and its duplication. The Spc42p associates with Spc110p and Spc29p, two other essential coiled-coil proteins that localize to the nuclear face of the SPB. Spc110 localizes to the central plaque and is thought to bind to Spc29p and calmodulin (Cmd1p). The role of Spc110p is a spacer molecule between the central and inner plaque and γ-tubilin complex binding protein. The essential function of calmodulin is at the SPB where it has been proposed to regulate binding of Spc110p to Spc29p. Spc29 forms in the central plaque a repeating structure. Spc98p and Spc97p are two similar yeast γ –tubulin (Tub4p) binding proteins required for microtubule nucleation. Spc98p, Spc97p and Tub4p are found at the inner and outer plaques of SPB and are involved in microtubules organization. Spc42 faces the cytoplasm and binds to coiled-coil Cnm67p (chaotic nuclear migration). Cnm67p forms dimers and functions as a spacer between IL2 and IL1. Cnm67 binds to the outer plaque protein Nud1p, a SPB protein required for exit from mitosis. Another coiled-coil protein, Spc72p, is also found in the outer plaque. Spc72p associates with Nud1p and to components of the γ-tubulin complex.

The half-bridge is the site of new SPB assembly, and it also plays a role in cytoplasmic microtubule nucleation during G1 and karyogamy. Both sides of the half-bridge are not equivalent. Two single-pass membrane proteins, Kar1p and Mps3p, localize to the half-bridge and are required to form and/or maintain the structure. Both proteins bind to Cdc31p, the yeast centrin homolog, which also localizes to the half-bridge and is required for half-bridge integrity. An additional half-bridge component, Sfi1p, shows ability to bind to Cdc31p through multiple conserved Cdc31-binding sites throughout its length. Kar1p is also involved in connecting the half-bridge to the core SPB via its interaction with Bbp1p. In addition, Kar1p plays a role in reorganization of the SPB during G1.

== SPB duplication pathway in Saccharomyces cerevisiae ==
Duplication of the SPB once, and only once, during each cell cycle is essential for formation of a bipolar mitotic spindle and accurate chromosome segregation. SPB duplication in S. cerevisiae can be divided into several steps. The first step occurs early in G1, when satellite material forms on cytoplasmic tip of half-bridge. During the second step half-bridge elongates and completes its nuclear and cytoplasmic faces fusion. In the same time satellite forms duplication plaque, a layered structure that is similar to the cytoplasmic half of a mature SPB. The last step of SPB duplication is insertion of the duplication plaque into the nuclear envelope and assembly of nuclear SPB components. At the end of G1 yeast cells contain two duplicated side-by-side SPBs connected by a complete bridge. Then bridge separates and SPB nucleates bipolar spindle. SPB continues to grow until mitosis, so protein components are able to incorporate into both SPBs throughout the cell cycle.
