= FAM178B =

Protein coding

Identifiers
- Aliases: FAM178B, family with sequence similarity 178 member B
- External IDs: MGI: 3026913; GeneCards: FAM178B

Gene location (Human)
Chr.	Chromosome 2 (human)
Band	2q11.2	Start	96,875,882 bp
Band	2q11.2	End	96,986,580 bp

Gene location (Mouse)
Chr.	Chromosome 1 (mouse)
Band	1|1 B	Start	36,601,773 bp
Band	1|1 B	End	36,722,264 bp
RNA expression pattern
Bgee	Human / Mouse (ortholog); Top expressed in: C1 segment; gonad; tibial nerve; testicle; bone marrow; substantia nigra; bone marrow cell; putamen; sural nerve; spleen / Top expressed in: seminiferous tubule; sciatic nerve; spermatid; spermatocyte; otolith organ; utricle; lumbar spinal ganglion; zygote; embryo; oocyte; More reference expression data
BioGPS	n/a
Orthologs
Databases	NCBI: entry; OMA: entry
Species	Human	Mouse
Entrez	51252	381337
Ensembl	ENSG00000168754	ENSMUSG00000046337
UniProt	Q8IXR5	Q24JP3
RefSeq (mRNA)	NM_001122646; NM_001172667; NM_016490	NM_001126046; NM_027957; NM_201365; NM_001372416; NM_001372417
RefSeq (protein)	NP_001116118; NP_001166138; NP_057574	NP_001119518; NP_082233; NP_958753; NP_001359345; NP_001359346
Location (UCSC)	Chr 2: 96.88 – 96.99 Mb	Chr 1: 36.6 – 36.72 Mb
PubMed search
- Wikidata
View/Edit Human	View/Edit Mouse

FAM178B is a protein coding gene that is located on the plus strand of chromosome 2. The locus for the gene is 2q11.2. It is also known by the aliases Family with Sequence Similarity 178, Member B, and HSPC234. In total there are 24 exons in the gene. FAM178B spans 110,720 base pairs, and contains 827 amino acids.

== Forms ==
There are two isoforms of the gene transcript that exist by alternative splicing, and one gene precursor.

FAM178B Isoforms from Splice Variation:
Isoform:	Identifier:	Length in Amino Acids:	Mass (daltons):
1	Q8IXR5-1	827	93,514
2	Q8IXR5-2	119	13,809
3	Q8IXR5-3	679	76,515

SLF2 (FAM178A) is an important paralog of FAM178B. SLF2 is predicted to play a role in the DNA damage response (DDR) pathway by regulating post-replication repair of UV-damaged DNA, and genomic stability maintenance.

== Protein structure ==
The molecular weight of the protein is 76.5 kilodaltons, and the isoelectric point is 5.47.The gene has 6 transcript splice variants. The protein has been phenotypically associated with bipolar disease due to its locus, as well as body mass index (BMI), and cell adhesion. A proposed structure for the protein can be found in the images for proposed structures. The secondary structure for the FAM178B protein is predicted to be primarily alpha helices. The tertiary structure of the protein may assume a coiled coil structure.

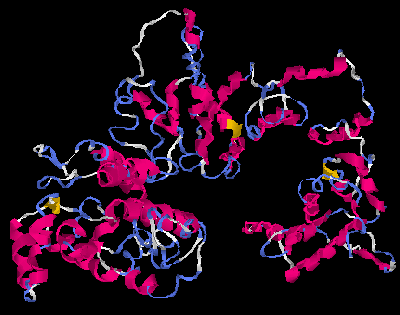

== Expression ==
FAM178B is most highly expressed in the skeletal muscle and brain tissues.The structure in which it is highly concentrated is in the corpus callosum of the brain. Additionally, it is of high levels in the trigeminal nerve and spinal cord. Further, there is also high concentrations of the gene found near the heart, testes and olfactory regions.

According to the Allen Brain Atlas, the olfactory regions, and the hippocampus of the mouse brain showed the greatest expressions of the gene when tested experimentally.

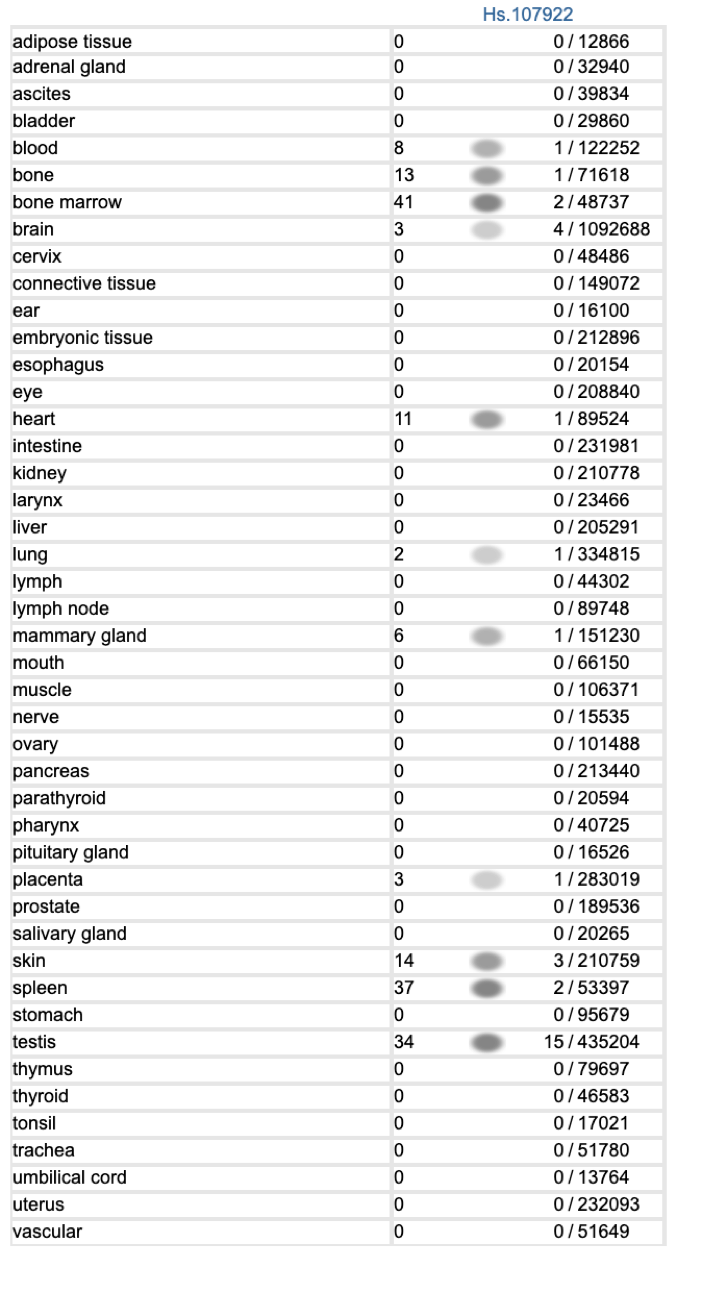

== DNA Level Regulation ==
The proposed promoter region of FAM178B protein is below. A table of relevant transcription factor binding sites that correspond to the sequence and colors highlighted in the promoter region is also included.

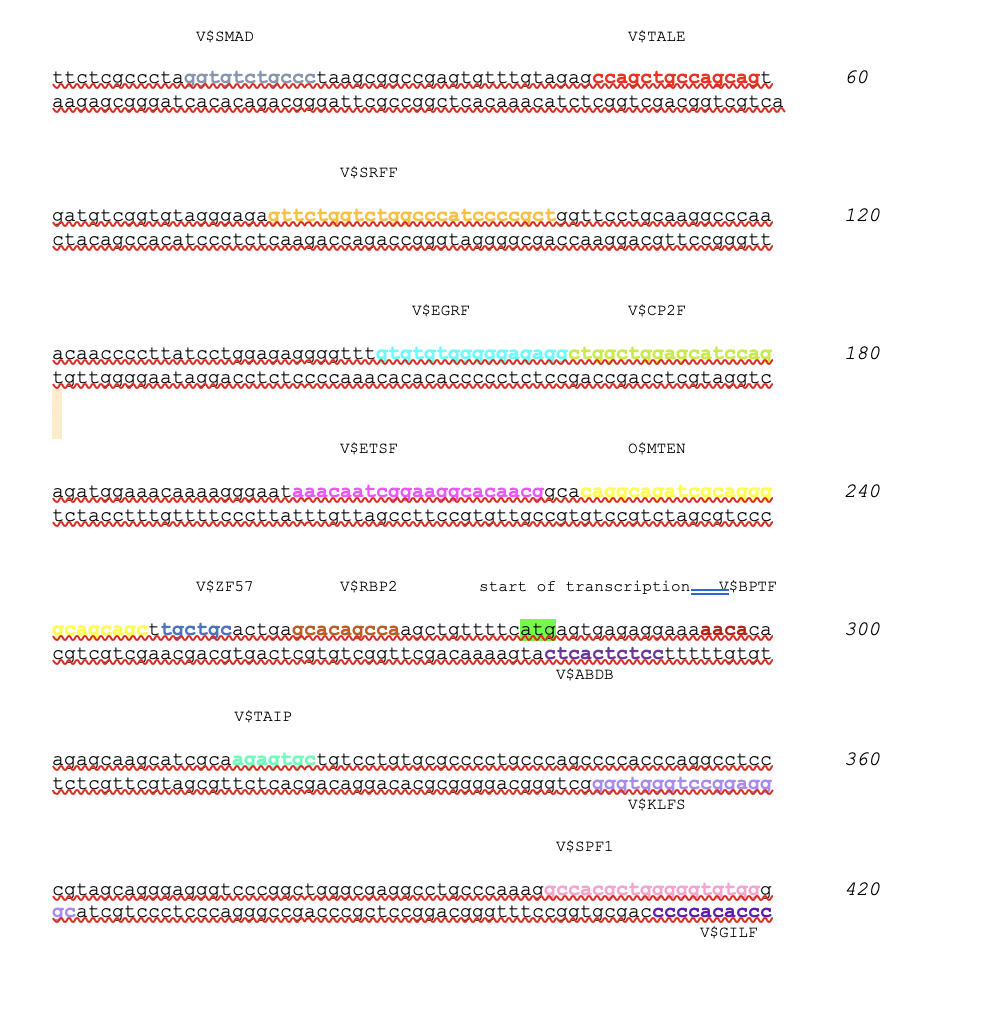

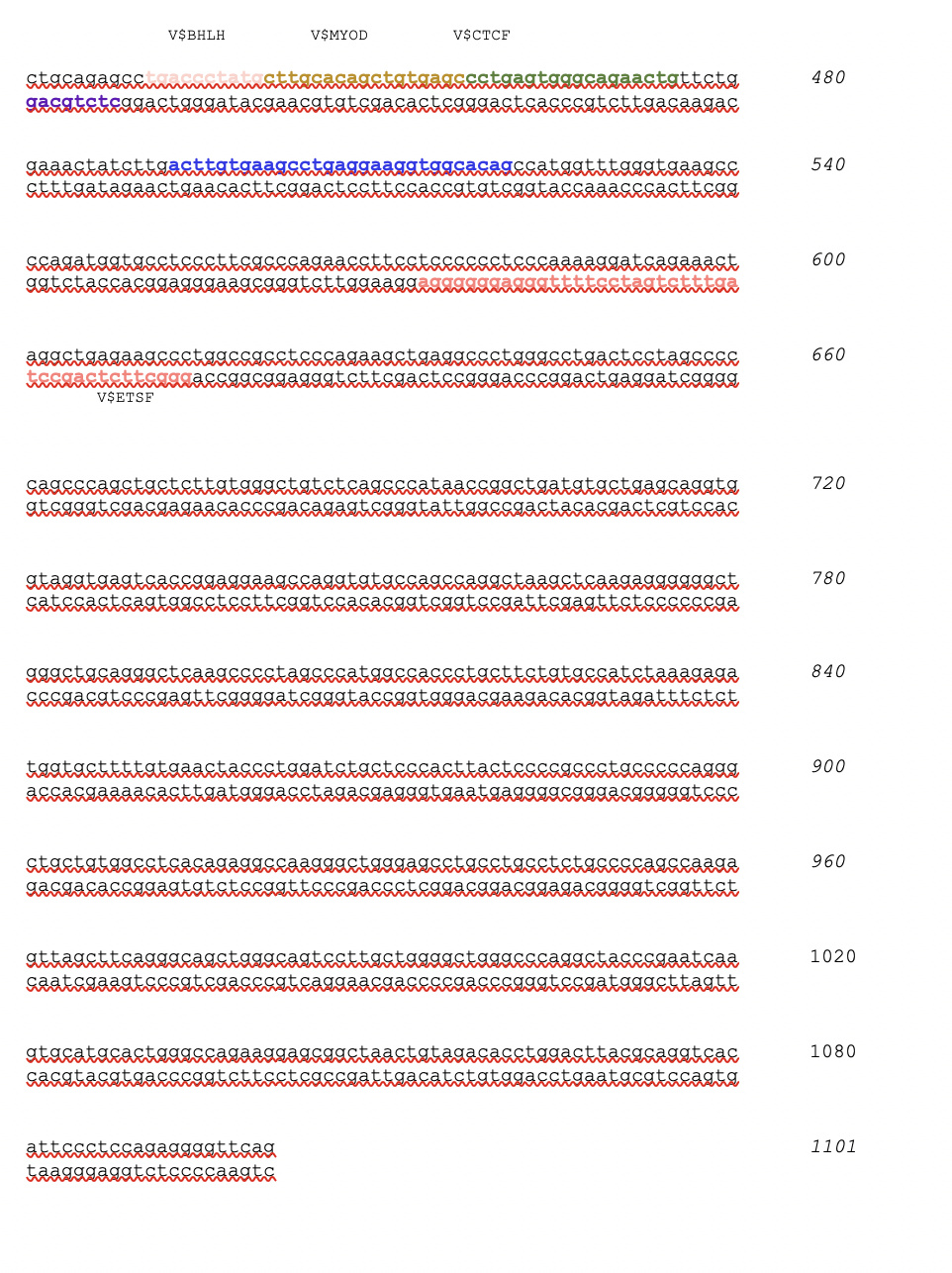

The promoter region of FAM178B is highly conserved across its most related orthologs, and is almost identical across the human, gorilla, chimp, bonobo and gibbon organisms.

== Protein Level Regulation ==
Below is a table that shows the protein modifications that could be potentially made to FAM178B, and the potential effects of these modifications on the protein itself:.

== Homology and Evolution ==
An important paralog of the gene is SLF2, which plays a role in the DNA damage response (DDR) pathway by regulating post replication repair of UV-damaged DNA. It also helps maintain genomic stability. There are 74 known orthologs of the protein, and it can be traced back as far back as crustaceans. FAM178B is heavily found in both vertebrates and invertebrates. The ortholog space for the protein FAM178B is quite large as it can be traced back 794 millions of years ago (mya) to mollusks with the apple snail, and Pacific Oyster. There are 134 known orthologs of FAM178B. However, the protein is not found in arthropods, or insects, which is interesting because those organisms also existed in that time period meaning that it was conserved across some taxa, but not others. The protein is most readily found in primates, and other non-primate mammals. The protein is also conserved across reptiles, some bony fish, and cartilaginous fish, and birds.

Below is a table illustrating some of the orthologs for FAM178B using BLAST and BLAT.

Scientific name:	Common name:	Accession number from NCBI:	Sequence length: (Amino Acids)	Date of Divergence from Human Lineage: (millions of years ago)	Percent identity:	Percent Similarity:
Homo Sapiens	Human	Q8IXR5.2	827	--	--	--
Macaca Mulatta	Macque	XP_014968433	709	28.1	80	83
Chlorocebus Sabaeus	Green Monkey	XP_008006245	724	28.1	91	94
Cebus Capucinus	Capuchin	XP_017379417	808	42.6	88	91
Otolemur Garnettii	Galago	XP_012666502	675	73.0	74	81
Marmota Marmota	Marmot	XP_015355109	692	88.0	74	80
Microtus Ochrogaster	Vole	XP_026641579	561	88.0	68	75
Felis Catus	Cat	XP_019682636	720	94.0	71	77
Equus Caballus	Horse	XP_023474395	659	94.0	78	84
Panthera Tigris	Tiger	XP_007097881	674	94.0	75	80
Miniopterus Natalensis	Bat	XP_016077151	649	94.0	73	81
Bison Bison	Bison	XP_010828157	664	94.0	65	73
Tursiops Truncatus	Dolphin	JH473473	827	94.0	61	68
Alligator Mississippiensis	Alligator	XP_019343229	802	320.0	34	47
Pogona Vitticeps	Bearded Dragon	XP_020635880	1003	320.0	41	56
Apteryx Rowi	Kiwi	XP_025941058	512	320.0	42	58
Gallus Gallus	Chicken	XP_024998603	547	320.0	37	50
Rhincodon Typus	Whale Shark	XP_020388490	1155	465.0	34	53
Callorhinchus Milii	Australian Ghostshark	XP_007910600	860	465.0	33	50
Crassostrea Gigas	Pacific Oyser	EKC42969	1222	794.0	24	38
Pomacea Canaliculta	Applesnail	PVD30455	1229	794.0	24	45

Timetree for FAM178B

== Interacting Proteins ==
There are 2 proteins that have high predicted values of interaction with FAM178B: LRSAM 1 and ZNF598. LRSAM1 is also known as leucine rich repeat and sterile alpha motif protein 1. The value for the protein is .29 and the evidence is physical from hybrid pooling approaches. LRSAM1 was previously known as Tsg-associated ligase and is located on the LRSAM1 gene. Mutations have been associated with periphery neuropathy, and sensory disorders. It is highly expressed in the spinal cord, as is FAM178B. There is currently no known structure for the protein. ZNF598 is a zinc finger protein and the value is .13. It plays a key role in ribosome quality control. The predicted structures are below for both proteins.

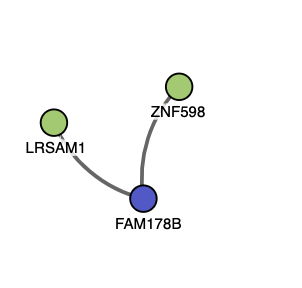
MENTHA interacting proteins for FAM178B.

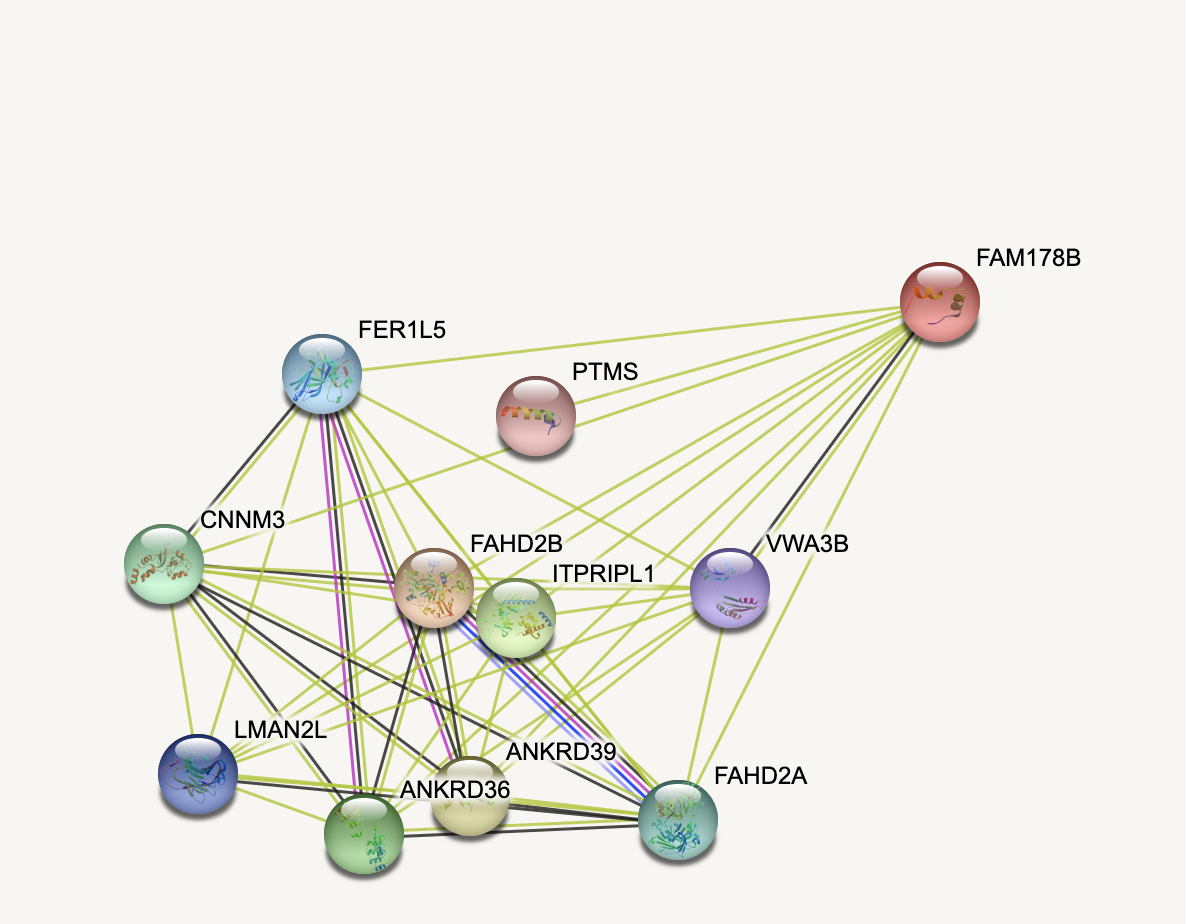
STRING interacting proteins for FAM178B.
