= Repertoire (disambiguation) =

A repertoire is a list or set of works ready to perform, among other meanings

Repertoire may also refer to:

- Musical repertoire, a set of prepared musical compositions
- Repertoire Records, a German record label specialising in 1960s and 1970s pop and rock reissues
- Character repertoire, the full set of symbols or graphemes that a particular character encoding can support
- In computing, the instruction set is also known as the "instruction repertoire"
- Le Répertoire de la Cuisine, commonly called Le Répertoire, a culinary reference book by Louis Saulnier
- Opening repertoire, a collection of a chess player's favoured openings
- James Acaster: Repertoire, a 2018 Netflix show by comedian James Acaster

== See also ==
- REPAIRtoire, a biology database
- Repertory theater, a system of theatrical production and performance scheduling
