= MDL-811 =

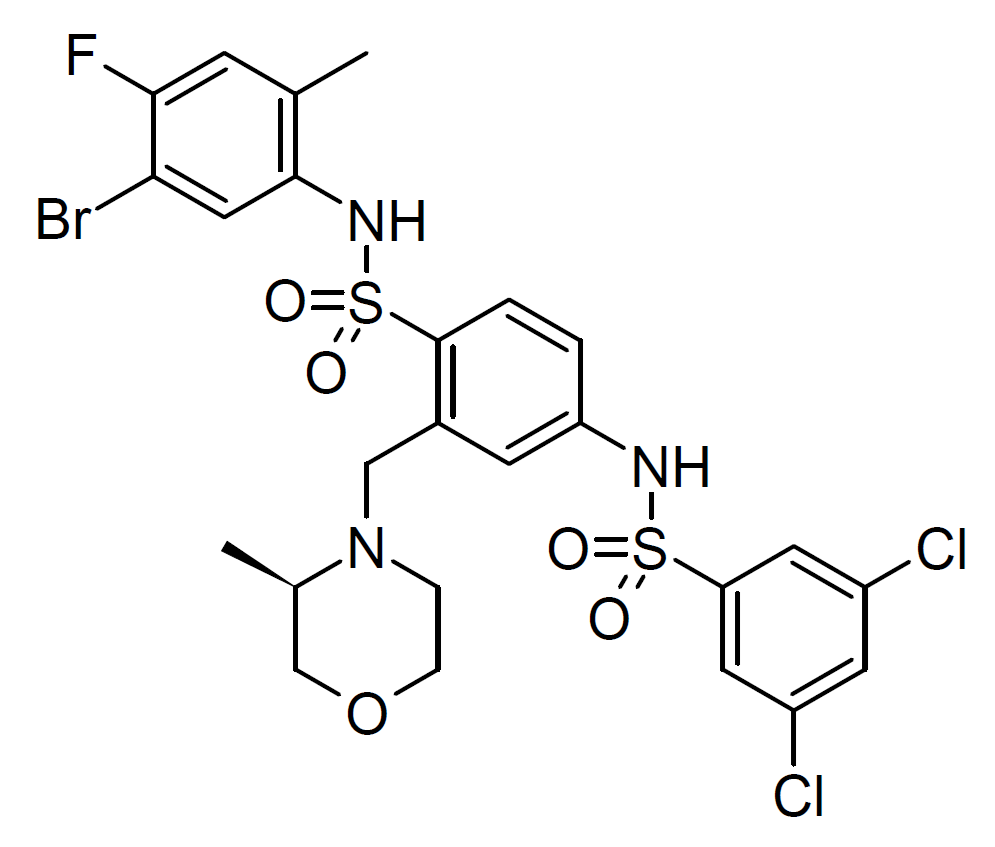

Clinical data
- Drug class: Sirtuin-6 (SIRT6) activator

Identifiers
- IUPAC name: N-(5-bromo-4-fluoro-2-methylphenyl)-4-[(3,5-dichlorophenyl)sulfonylamino]-2-[[(3R)-3-methylmorpholin-4-yl]methyl]benzenesulfonamide
- CAS Number: 2275619-98-0
- PubChem CID: 169450636
- ChemSpider: 129309230
- ChEMBL: ChEMBL5275868

Chemical and physical data
- Formula: C_{25}H_{25}BrCl_{2}FN_{3}O_{5}S_{2}
- Molar mass: 681.41 g·mol^{−1}
- 3D model (JSmol): Interactive image
- SMILES: C[C@@H]1COCCN1CC2=C(C=CC(=C2)NS(=O)(=O)C3=CC(=CC(=C3)Cl)Cl)S(=O)(=O)NC4=CC(=C(C=C4C)F)Br
- InChI: InChI=1S/C25H25BrCl2FN3O5S2/c1-15-7-23(29)22(26)12-24(15)31-39(35,36)25-4-3-20(8-17(25)13-32-5-6-37-14-16(32)2)30-38(33,34)21-10-18(27)9-19(28)11-21/h3-4,7-12,16,30-31H,5-6,13-14H2,1-2H3/t16-/m1/s1; Key:ULBHGKXUHYSORN-MRXNPFEDSA-N

MDL-811 is a drug which acts as a sirtuin-6 (SIRT6) activator. It has antiinflammatory effects and shows neuroprotective effects in animal models of stroke and heart attack.
