= Forvisirvat =

Sirtuin-6 activator

Clinical data
- Other names: SP624
- Routes of administration: Oral
- Drug class: Sirtuin-6 (SIRT6) activator

Identifiers
- IUPAC name: (2S,5'R)-7-chloro-3',4-dimethoxy-5'-methyl-6-(5-methyl-1,3,4-oxadiazol-2-yl)spiro[1-benzofuran-2,4'-cyclohex-2-ene]-1',3-dione
- CAS Number: 2135638-06-9
- PubChem CID: 131964504
- ChemSpider: 129910029
- UNII: XZD8UGS9H9
- KEGG: D13109

Chemical and physical data
- Formula: C_{19}H_{17}ClN_{2}O_{6}
- Molar mass: 404.80 g·mol^{−1}
- 3D model (JSmol): Interactive image
- SMILES: C[C@@H]1CC(=O)C=C([C@]12C(=O)C3=C(C=C(C(=C3O2)Cl)C4=NN=C(O4)C)OC)OC
- InChI: InChI=1S/C19H17ClN2O6/c1-8-5-10(23)6-13(26-4)19(8)17(24)14-12(25-3)7-11(15(20)16(14)28-19)18-22-21-9(2)27-18/h6-8H,5H2,1-4H3/t8-,19+/m1/s1; Key:MIHSWFYCAJWPIS-YLVJLNSGSA-N

Forvisirvat (INN, USAN; developmental code name SP-624) is a selective sirtuin-6 (SIRT6) activator which is under development for the treatment of major depressive disorder and schizophrenia. It is taken by mouth. The drug produces antidepressant-like effects in multiple animal models of depression. As of January 2025, forvisirvat is in phase 2/3 clinical trials for major depressive disorder and is in phase 1/2 clinical trials for schizophrenia. It is under development by Sirtsei Pharmaceuticals and Arrivo BioVentures.

== See also ==
- List of investigational antidepressants
- List of investigational antipsychotics
- Griseofulvin
