= SiDNA =

Signal interfering DNA (siDNA) is a class of short modified double stranded DNA molecules, 8–64 base pairs in length. siDNA molecules are capable of inhibiting DNA repair activities by interfering with multiple repair pathways. These molecules are known to act by mimicking DNA breaks and interfering with recognition and repair of DNA damage induced on chromosomes by irradiation or genotoxic products.

== Dbait ==
Dbait is a specific siDNA molecule that has been shown to mimic signalling of double-stranded DNA breaks (DSBs) in vivo. Currently, Dbait is the only type of siDNA molecule having been reviewed.

=== Mechanism of Action of Dbait ===
The siDNA family, led by Dbait, consists of 32 base pairs deoxyribonucleotide forming an intramolecular double helix, which mimics DNA double-strand break lesions. In the event of a double-stranded break in the genome, the cell most commonly repairs the damaged segment via non-homologous end joining (NHEJ). NHEJ involves the ligation of the damaged segments without using a homologous strand as a template, and can lead to frameshift mutations and failure of the cell to properly halt the cell division cycle, which could lead to the cancerization of the cell. Dbait functions primarily by targeting the NHEJ pathway, with the cell detecting the presence of siDNA molecules as double stranded breaks (DSBs). Dbait triggers baited activation of signalling enzymes involved in NHEJ-mediated genome repair to initiate the appropriate cellular response. Dbait is first bound to by Ku protein complexes that trigger the phosphorylation of NHEJ initiation factors such as DNA-PK (DNA-dependent protein kinase) and PARP (polyadenyl-ribose polymerase). DNA-PK overactivation through Dbait in turn triggers the activity of numerous signalling proteins in the NHEJ signalling cascade. DNA-PK hyperactivation induces pan-nuclear phosphorylation of histone H2AX among all the chromatin. H2AX phosphorylation is the signal, which allows double-strand break repair proteins to form DNA repair complexes selectively on DNA double-strand breaks. Dbait-dependent unspecific phosphorylation of H2AX results in inefficient double strand break recognition and repair.

== Possible therapeutic application of Dbait ==
Most anti-cancer therapies act by induction of DNA damage (chemotherapy and radiation therapy). DNA breaks are the most lethal damage for cells, as double-stranded breaks can lead to loss of entire chromosomal fragments, and even one single double-strand break if unrepaired is sufficient to lead to cell death. Dbait enhances the efficacy of the DNA damaging agents as demonstrated with radiation therapy and/or chemotherapy in multiple in vivo experimental models such as melanoma, glioblastoma and colorectal cancer.

Preclinical proof of concept of the synergic effect of the clinical candidate, DT01, with radiation therapy lead to a first-in-human Phase I, to evaluate the tolerance and efficacy of local DT01 administration in association with RT in patients suffering from in-transit metastases of melanoma. Encouraging results were published in May 2016.
