= OSS-128167 =

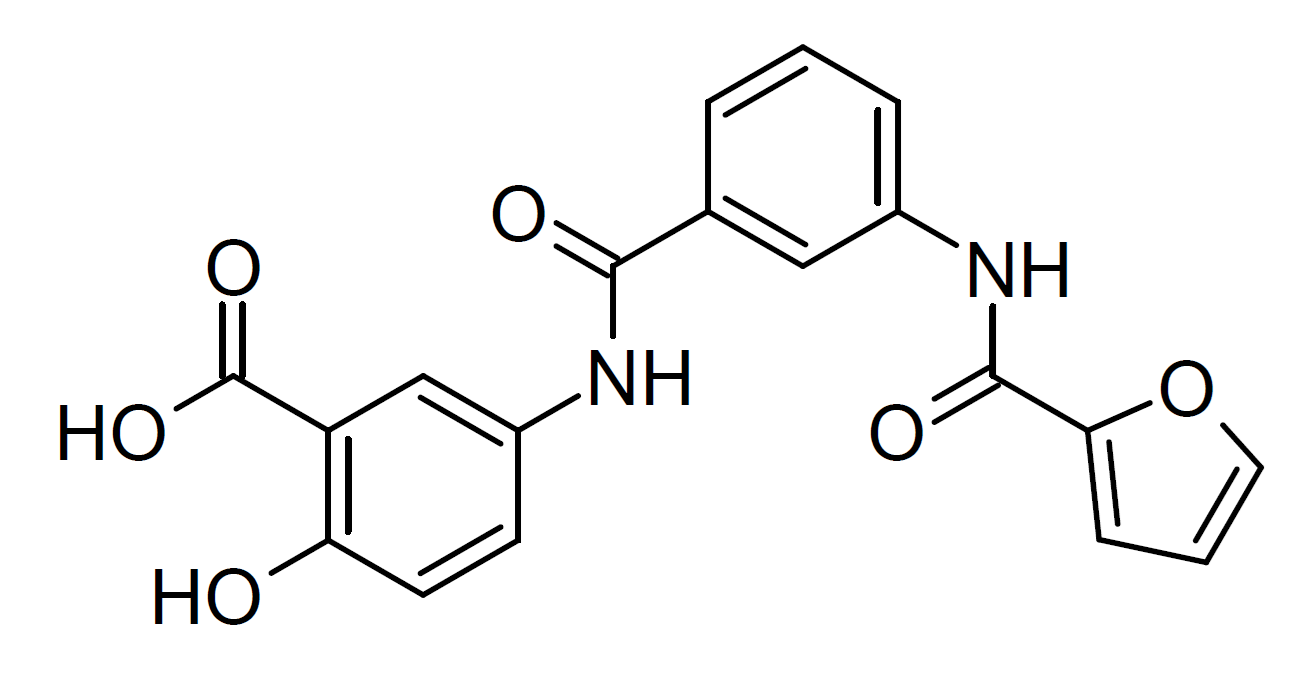

Clinical data
- Drug class: Sirtuin-6 (SIRT6) inhibitor

Identifiers
- IUPAC name: 5-[[3-(furan-2-carbonylamino)benzoyl]amino]-2-hydroxybenzoic acid
- CAS Number: 887686-02-4
- PubChem CID: 6496840
- ChemSpider: 4997276
- ChEMBL: ChEMBL1588664

Chemical and physical data
- Formula: C_{19}H_{14}N_{2}O_{6}
- Molar mass: 366.329 g·mol^{−1}
- 3D model (JSmol): Interactive image
- SMILES: C1=CC(=CC(=C1)NC(=O)C2=CC=CO2)C(=O)NC3=CC(=C(C=C3)O)C(=O)O
- InChI: InChI=1S/C19H14N2O6/c22-15-7-6-13(10-14(15)19(25)26)20-17(23)11-3-1-4-12(9-11)21-18(24)16-5-2-8-27-16/h1-10,22H,(H,20,23)(H,21,24)(H,25,26); Key:HTJWLEGCECXGSQ-UHFFFAOYSA-N

OSS-128167 is a drug which acts as a sirtuin-6 (SIRT6) inhibitor. It has pro-inflammatory effects and accelerates cellular aging; however, it shows anti-viral and anti-cancer properties which are useful in research, and has also demonstrated potential medical applications for SIRT6 inhibitors such as in the treatment of some forms of asthma.
