= Sirtuin 6 =

Protein-coding gene in the species Homo sapiens

SIRT6
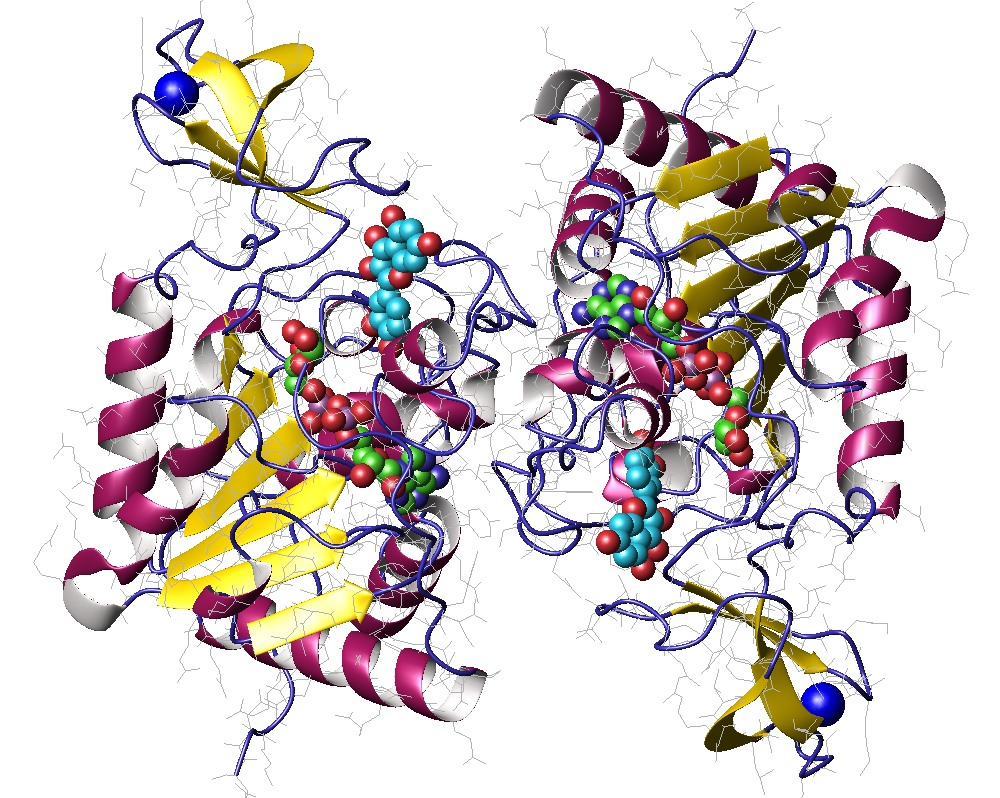

Identifiers
- Aliases: SIRT6, SIR2L6, sirtuin 6
- External IDs: OMIM: 606211; MGI: 1354161; GeneCards: SIRT6
Available structures
| PDB | Ortholog search: PDBe RCSB |
| PDB | List of PDB id codes 3K35, 3PKI, 3PKJ, 3ZG6 |
Enzyme activity
| EC # | BRENDA | ExPASy | KEGG | MetaCyc |
|---|---|---|---|---|
| 2.3.1.286 | ↗ | ↗ | ↗ | ↗ |

Gene location (Human)
| Chr. | Chromosome 19 (human) |
| Band | 19p13.3 | Start | 4,174,109 bp |
| Band | 19p13.3 | End | 4,182,566 bp |

Gene location (Mouse)
| Chr. | Chromosome 10 (mouse) |
| Band | 10 C1|10 39.72 cM | Start | 81,457,619 bp |
| Band | 10 C1|10 39.72 cM | End | 81,463,631 bp |
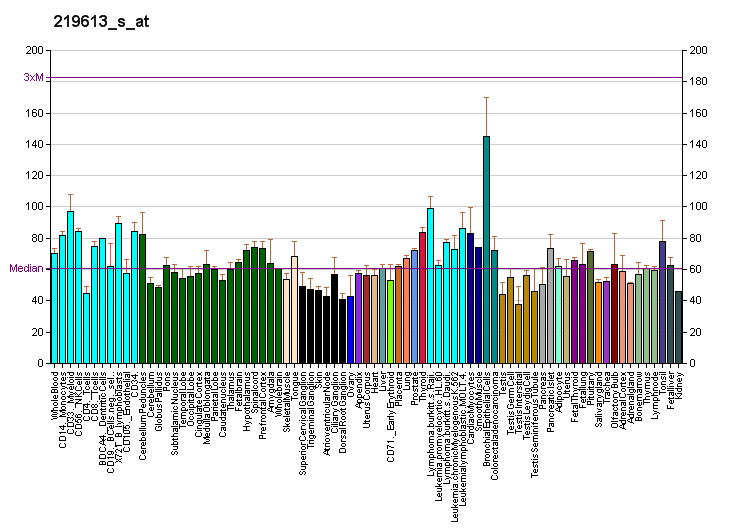
RNA expression pattern
| Bgee | Human / Mouse (ortholog); Top expressed in: mucosa of transverse colon; granulocyte; tendon of biceps brachii; anterior pituitary; right hemisphere of cerebellum; body of pancreas; apex of heart; spleen; left adrenal cortex; right adrenal gland / Top expressed in: morula; neural tube; zygote; ventricular zone; yolk sac; blastocyst; granulocyte; lip; ascending aorta; embryo; More reference expression data |
| BioGPS | More reference expression data |
Gene ontology
| Molecular function | NAD-dependent histone deacetylase activity; transcription corepressor activity; protein deacetylase activity; zinc ion binding; chromatin binding; metal ion binding; protein binding; NAD+ ADP-ribosyltransferase activity; hydrolase activity; NAD-dependent protein deacetylase activity; NAD+ binding; NAD+-protein-arginine ADP-ribosyltransferase activity; NAD-dependent histone deacetylase activity (H3-K9 specific); histone deacetylase activity |
| Cellular component | cytoplasm; nucleolus; nucleoplasm; nucleus |
| Biological process | negative regulation of glycolytic process; glucose homeostasis; regulation of double-strand break repair via homologous recombination; positive regulation of fibroblast proliferation; protein deacetylation; negative regulation of glucose import; response to nutrient levels; protein destabilization; post-embryonic cardiac muscle cell growth involved in heart morphogenesis; negative regulation of transcription, DNA-templated; positive regulation of stem cell proliferation; base-excision repair; negative regulation of cell population proliferation; histone deacetylation; histone H3-K9 modification; histone H3-K9 deacetylation; protein ADP-ribosylation; positive regulation of telomere maintenance; positive regulation of chondrocyte proliferation; positive regulation of blood vessel branching; positive regulation of vascular endothelial cell proliferation; positive regulation of cold-induced thermogenesis; negative regulation of transcription by RNA polymerase II; histone H3 deacetylation |
Sources:Amigo / QuickGO
Orthologs
| Databases | NCBI: entry; OMA: entry |
| Species | Human | Mouse |
| Entrez | 51548 | 50721 |
| Ensembl | ENSG00000077463 | ENSMUSG00000034748 |
| UniProt | Q8N6T7 | P59941 |
| RefSeq (mRNA) | NM_001193285; NM_016539; NM_001321058; NM_001321059; NM_001321060 NM_001321061; NM_001321062; NM_001321063; NM_001321064 | NM_001163430; NM_181586; NM_001378944; NM_001378945 |
| RefSeq (protein) | NP_001180214; NP_001307987; NP_001307988; NP_001307989; NP_001307990 NP_001307991; NP_001307992; NP_001307993; NP_057623 | NP_001156902; NP_853617; NP_001365873; NP_001365874 |
| Location (UCSC) | Chr 19: 4.17 – 4.18 Mb | Chr 10: 81.46 – 81.46 Mb |
| PubMed search |
- Wikidata
| View/Edit Human | View/Edit Mouse |

Sirtuin 6 (SIRT6 or Sirt6) is a stress responsive protein deacetylase and mono-ADP ribosyltransferase enzyme encoded by the SIRT6 gene. In laboratory research, SIRT6 appears to function in multiple molecular pathways related to aging, including DNA repair, telomere maintenance, glycolysis, inflammation, and Chromatin organization. SIRT6 is member of the mammalian sirtuin family of proteins, which are homologs to the yeast Sir2 protein.

== Research ==
Sirt6 is mainly known as a deacetylase of histones H3 and H4, an activity by which it changes chromatin density and regulates gene expression. The enzymatic activity of Sirt6, as well as of the other members of the sirtuins family, is dependent upon the binding of the cofactor nicotinamide adenine dinucleotide (NAD+).

Mice which have been genetically engineered to overexpress Sirt6 protein exhibit an extended maximum lifespan. This lifespan extension, of about 15–16 percent, is observed only in male mice.

== DNA repair ==
SIRT6 is a chromatin-associated protein that is required for normal base excision repair and double-strand break repair of DNA damage in mammalian cells. Deficiency of SIRT6 in mice leads to abnormalities that overlap with aging-associated degenerative processes.

SIRT6 promotes the repair of DNA double-strand breaks by the process of non-homologous end joining and homologous recombination. SIRT6 stabilizes the repair protein DNA-PKcs (DNA-dependent protein kinase catalytic subunit) at chromatin sites of damage.

As normal human fibroblasts replicate and progress towards replicative senescence the capability to undergo homologous recombinational repair (HRR) declines. However, over-expression of SIRT6 in “middle-aged” and pre-senescent cells strongly stimulates HRR. This effect depends on the mono-ADP ribosylation activity of poly(ADP-ribose) polymerase (PARP1). SIRT6 also rescues the decline in base excision repair of aged human fibroblasts in a PARP1 dependent manner.

== Ligands ==
Activators

Sirt6 deacetylation activity can be stimulated by high concentrations (several hundred micromolar) of fatty acids, and more potently by a first series of synthetic activators based on a pyrrolo[1,2-a]quinoxaline scaffold. Crystal structures of Sirt6/activator complexes show that the compounds exploit a SIRT6 specific pocket in the enzyme's substrate acyl binding channel.

- Among many anthocyanidins studied, cyanidin most potently stimulated activity of the SIRT6.
- Forvisirvat (SP-624) is also an activator of Sirt6.
- MDL-811
- UBCS039
- SIRT6 activator 12q

Inhibitors

- JYQ-42
- OSS-128167
