= SIRT6 activator 12q =

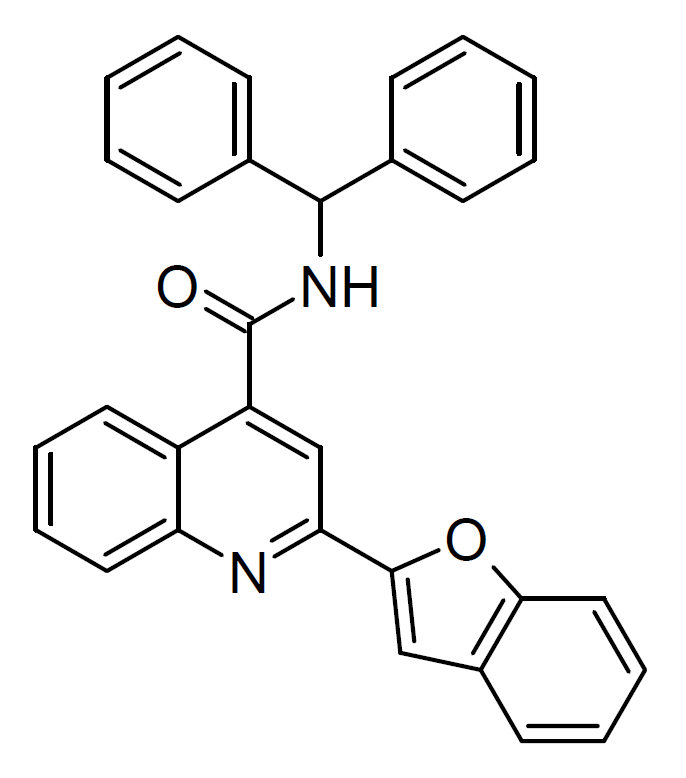

Clinical data
- Drug class: Sirtuin-6 (SIRT6) activator

Identifiers
- IUPAC name: N-benzhydryl-2-(1-benzofuran-2-yl)quinoline-4-carboxamide
- CAS Number: 2601734-99-8
- PubChem CID: 156013743
- ChemSpider: 115037051
- ChEMBL: ChEMBL4636189

Chemical and physical data
- Formula: C_{31}H_{22}N_{2}O_{2}
- Molar mass: 454.529 g·mol^{−1}
- 3D model (JSmol): Interactive image
- SMILES: C1=CC=C(C=C1)C(C2=CC=CC=C2)NC(=O)C3=CC(=NC4=CC=CC=C43)C5=CC6=CC=CC=C6O5
- InChI: InChI=1S/C31H22N2O2/c34-31(33-30(21-11-3-1-4-12-21)22-13-5-2-6-14-22)25-20-27(32-26-17-9-8-16-24(25)26)29-19-23-15-7-10-18-28(23)35-29/h1-20,30H,(H,33,34); Key:JNULQPRWYHVXHT-UHFFFAOYSA-N

SIRT6 activator 12q is a drug which acts as a sirtuin-6 (SIRT6) activator. It has been researched as a potential therapeutic agent for the treatment of pancreatic ductal adenocarcinoma, as well as being used for basic research into the structure and function of the SIRT6 enzyme complex.
