= UBCS039 =

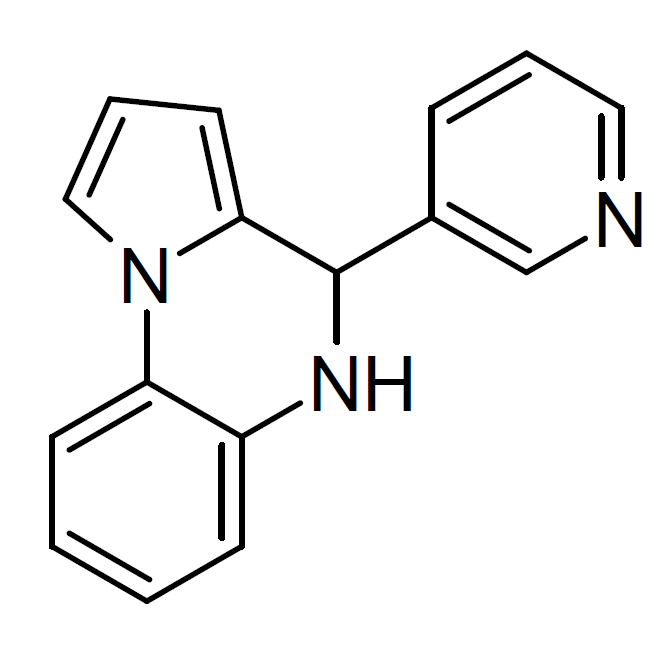

Clinical data
- Drug class: Sirtuin-6 (SIRT6) activator

Identifiers
- IUPAC name: 4-pyridin-3-yl-4,5-dihydropyrrolo[1,2-a]quinoxaline
- CAS Number: 358721-70-7
- PubChem CID: 2803797
- ChemSpider: 2082397
- ChEMBL: ChEMBL4636092

Chemical and physical data
- Formula: C_{16}H_{13}N_{3}
- Molar mass: 247.301 g·mol^{−1}
- 3D model (JSmol): Interactive image
- SMILES: C1=CC=C2C(=C1)NC(C3=CC=CN32)C4=CN=CC=C4
- InChI: InChI=1S/C16H13N3/c1-2-7-14-13(6-1)18-16(12-5-3-9-17-11-12)15-8-4-10-19(14)15/h1-11,16,18H; Key:BSOBGTYXYGHUTD-UHFFFAOYSA-N

UBCS039 is a drug which acts as a sirtuin-6 (SIRT6) activator. It was the first synthetic SIRT6 activator to be developed, and while it has comparatively lower potency compared to some newer agents, it is still widely used in research. It has antiinflammatory effects and is protective against kidney toxicity, as well as showing beneficial actions against lung and liver damage, cadmium toxicity, and arterial thrombosis.
