= JYQ-42 =

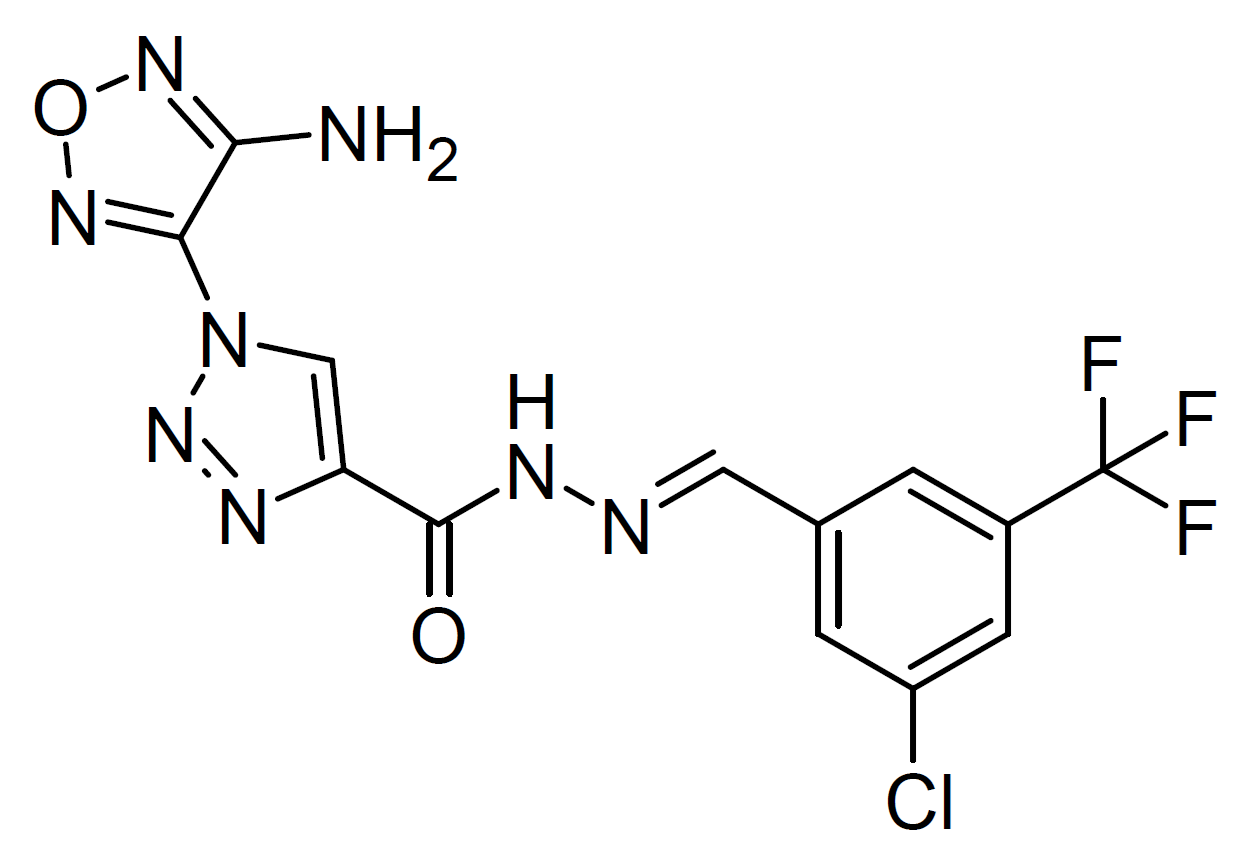

Clinical data
- Drug class: Sirtuin-6 (SIRT6) inhibitor

Identifiers
- IUPAC name: 1-(4-amino-1,2,5-oxadiazol-3-yl)-N-[(E)-[3-chloro-5-(trifluoromethyl)phenyl]methylideneamino]triazole-4-carboxamide
- CAS Number: 2838025-41-3
- PubChem CID: 175602516

Chemical and physical data
- Formula: C_{13}H_{8}ClF_{3}N_{8}O_{2}
- Molar mass: 400.71 g·mol^{−1}
- 3D model (JSmol): Interactive image
- SMILES: C1=C(C=C(C=C1C(F)(F)F)Cl)/C=N/NC(=O)C2=CN(N=N2)C3=NON=C3N
- InChI: InChI=1S/C13H8ClF3N8O2/c14-8-2-6(1-7(3-8)13(15,16)17)4-19-21-12(26)9-5-25(24-20-9)11-10(18)22-27-23-11/h1-5H,(H2,18,22)(H,21,26)/b19-4+; Key:YUEMOICLRSWFIT-RMOCHZDMSA-N

JYQ-42 is a drug which acts as a sirtuin-6 (SIRT6) inhibitor. It has potential applications in cancer treatment, having been found to inhibit the migration of pancreatic cancer cells and thereby reduce tumor invasiveness.
