= Postreplication repair =

Conversion of DNA single-stranded gaps

Postreplication repair is the repair of damage to the DNA that takes place after replication.

Some example genes in humans include:

- BRCA2 and BRCA1
- BLM
- NBS1

Accurate and efficient DNA replication is crucial for the health and survival of all living organisms. Under optimal conditions, the replicative DNA polymerases ε, δ, and α can work in concert to ensure that the genome is replicated efficiently with high accuracy in every cell cycle. However, DNA is constantly challenged by exogenous and endogenous genotoxic threats, including solar ultraviolet (UV) radiation and reactive oxygen species (ROS) generated as a byproduct of cellular metabolism. Damaged DNA can act as a steric block to replicative polymerases, thereby leading to incomplete DNA replication or the formation of secondary DNA strand breaks at the sites of replication stalling. Incomplete DNA synthesis and DNA strand breaks are both potential sources of genomic instability. An arsenal of DNA repair mechanisms exists to repair various forms of damaged DNA and minimize genomic instability. Most DNA repair mechanisms require an intact DNA strand as template to fix the damaged strand.

DNA damage prevents the normal enzymatic synthesis of DNA by the replication fork. At damaged sites in the genome, both prokaryotic and eukaryotic cells utilize a number of postreplication repair (PRR) mechanisms to complete DNA replication. Chemically modified bases can be bypassed by either error-prone or error-free translesion polymerases, or through genetic exchange with the sister chromatid. The replication of DNA with a broken sugar-phosphate backbone is most likely facilitated by the homologous recombination proteins that confer resistance to ionizing radiation. The activity of PRR enzymes is regulated by the SOS response in bacteria and may be controlled by the postreplication checkpoint response in eukaryotes.

The elucidation of PRR mechanisms is an active area of molecular biology research, and the terminology is currently in flux. For instance, PRR has recently been referred to as "DNA damage tolerance" to emphasize the instances in which postreplication DNA damage is repaired without removing the original chemical modification to the DNA. While the term PRR has most frequently been used to describe the repair of single-stranded postreplication gaps opposite damaged bases, a more broad usage has been suggested. In this case, the term PRR would encompasses all processes that facilitate the replication of damaged DNA, including those that repair replication-induced double-strand breaks.

Melanoma cells are commonly defective in postreplication repair of DNA damages that are in the form of cyclobutane pyrimidine dimers, a type of damage caused by ultraviolet radiation. A particular repair process that appears to be defective in melanoma cells is homologous recombinational repair. Defective postreplication repair of cyclobutane pyrimidine dimers can lead to mutations that are the primary driver of melanoma.
