= REPAIRtoire =

Database

Content
- Description: DNA repair pathways.

Contact
- Laboratory: Laboratory of Bioinformatics and Protein Engineering, International Institute of Molecular and Cell Biology, Poland.
- Authors: Kaja Milanowska
- Primary citation: Milanowska & al. (2011)
- Release date: 2010

Access
- Website: http://repairtoire.genesilico.pl/

REPAIRtoire is a database of resources for systems biology of DNA damage and repair.

== See also ==
- DNA repair
