= DNA repair =

Cellular mechanism

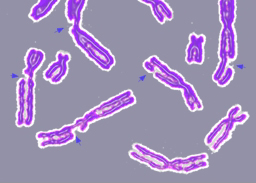
DNA damage resulting in multiple broken chromosomes

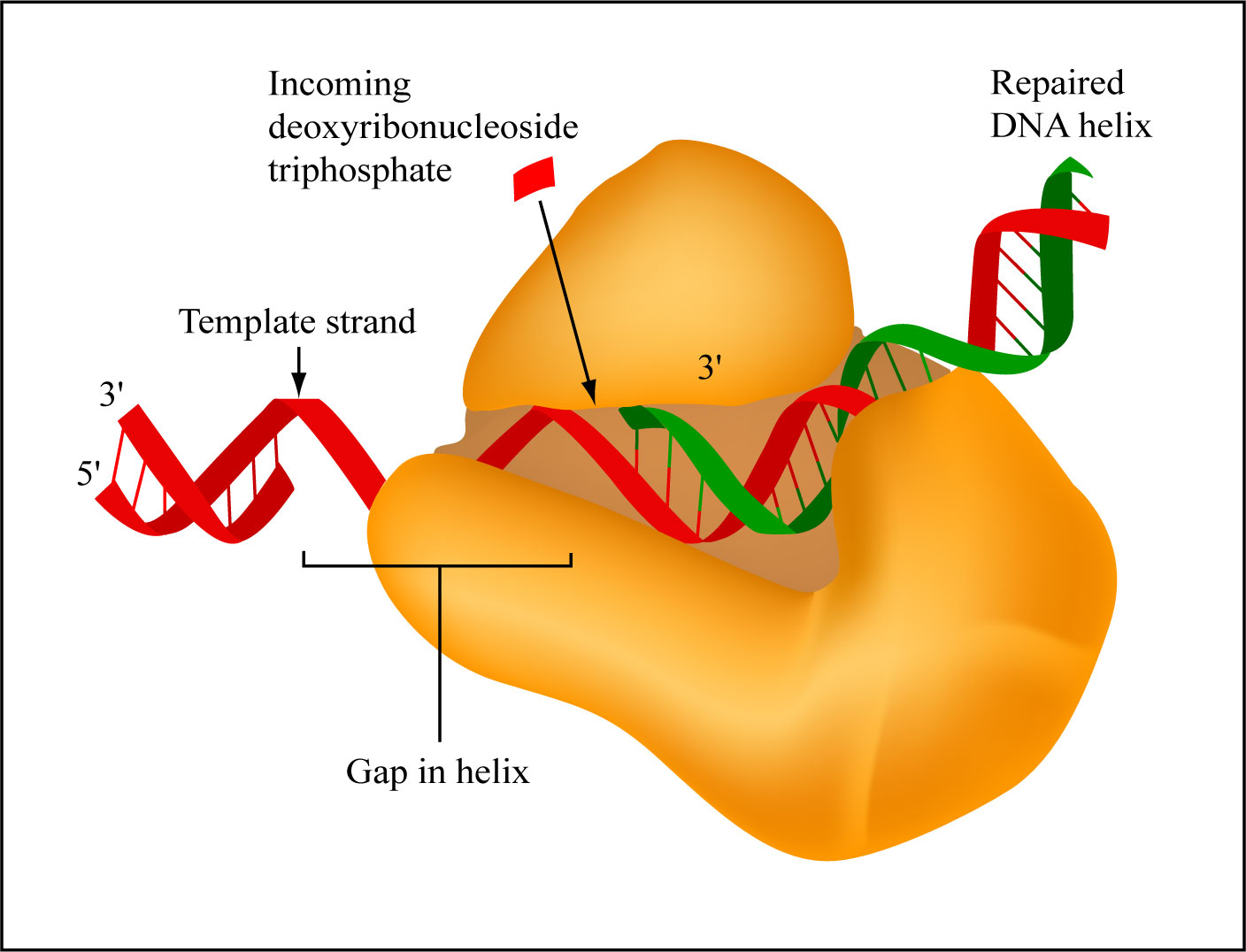
Diagram of DNA repair.

In molecular biology, DNA repair is a collection of processes by which a cell identifies and corrects damage to the DNA molecules that encode its genome. A weakened capacity for DNA repair is a risk factor for the development of cancer. DNA is constantly modified in cells, by internal metabolic by-products, and by external ionizing radiation, ultraviolet light, and medicines, resulting in spontaneous DNA damage involving tens of thousands of individual molecular lesions per cell per day. DNA modifications can also be programmed.

Molecular lesions can cause structural damage to the DNA molecule, and can alter or eliminate the cell's ability for transcription and gene expression. Other lesions may induce potentially harmful mutations in the cell's genome, which affect the survival of its daughter cells following mitosis. Consequently, DNA repair as part of the DNA damage response (DDR) is constantly active. When normal repair processes fail, including apoptosis, irreparable DNA damage may occur, that may be a risk factor for cancer.

The degree of DNA repair change made within a cell depends on various factors, including the cell type, the age of the cell, and the extracellular environment. A cell that has accumulated a large amount of DNA damage or can no longer effectively repair its DNA may enter one of three possible states:

1. an irreversible state of dormancy, known as senescence
2. apoptosis, a form of programmed cell death
3. unregulated division, which can lead to the formation of a tumor that is cancerous

The DNA repair ability of a cell is vital to the integrity of its genome and thus to the normal functionality of that organism. Many genes that were initially shown to influence life span have turned out to be involved in DNA damage repair and protection.

Paul Modrich talks about himself and his work in DNA repair.

The 2015 Nobel Prize in Chemistry was awarded to Tomas Lindahl, Paul Modrich, and Aziz Sancar for their work on the molecular mechanisms of DNA repair processes.

== DNA damage ==
DNA damage can be caused by both environmental factors and normal metabolic processes inside the cell, and occurs at a rate of 10,000 to 1,000,000 molecular lesions per cell per day. While this constitutes at most only 0.03% of the human genome's approximately 3.2 billion bases, unrepaired lesions in critical genes (such as tumor suppressor genes) can impede a cell's ability to carry out its function and appreciably increase the likelihood of tumor formation and contribute to tumor heterogeneity.

The vast majority of DNA damage affects the primary structure of the double helix; that is, the bases themselves are chemically modified. These modifications can in turn disrupt the molecules' regular helical structure by introducing non-native chemical bonds or bulky adducts that do not fit in the standard double helix. Unlike proteins and RNA, DNA usually lacks tertiary structure and therefore damage or disturbance does not occur at that level. Instead, DNA damage can affect the DNA supercoil structure and, in eukaryotic cells, the "packaging" histone proteins around which DNA winds around to form nucleosomes.

=== Sources ===
DNA damage can be subdivided into two main types:

1. endogenous damage such as attack by reactive oxygen species produced from normal metabolic byproducts (spontaneous mutation), especially the process of oxidative deamination
  1. also includes replication errors
2. exogenous damage caused by external agents such as
  1. ultraviolet (UV) radiation (200–400 nm) from the sun or other artificial light sources
  2. other radiation frequencies, including x-rays and gamma rays, and particles like electrons, neutrons, or alpha particles.
  3. hydrolysis or thermal disruption
  4. certain plant toxins
  5. human-made mutagenic chemicals, especially aromatic compounds that act as DNA intercalating agents
  6. viruses

The replication of damaged DNA before cell division can lead to the incorporation of wrong bases opposite damaged ones. Daughter cells that inherit these wrong bases carry mutations from which the original DNA sequence is unrecoverable (except in the rare case of a back mutation, for example, through gene conversion).

=== Types ===
There are several types of damage to DNA due to endogenous cellular processes:

1. oxidation of bases [e.g. 8-oxo-7,8-dihydroguanine (8-oxoG)] and generation of DNA strand interruptions from reactive oxygen species,
2. alkylation of bases (usually methylation), such as formation of 7-methylguanosine, 1-methyladenine, 6-O-Methylguanine
3. hydrolysis of bases, such as deamination, depurination, and depyrimidination.
4. "bulky adduct formation" (e.g., benzo[a]pyrene diol epoxide-dG adduct, aristolactam I-dA adduct)
5. mismatch of bases, due to errors in DNA replication, in which the wrong DNA base is stitched into place in a newly forming DNA strand, or a DNA base is skipped over or mistakenly inserted.
6. Monoadduct damage caused by change in single nitrogenous base of DNA
7. Di adduct damage

Damage caused by exogenous agents comes in many forms. Some examples are:

1. Absorption of UV light directly by DNA induces photochemical reactions, leading to the formation of pyrimidine dimers, and photoionization, provoking oxidative damage.
2. UV-A light creates mostly free radicals. The damage caused by free radicals is called indirect DNA damage.
3. Ionizing radiation such as that created by radioactive decay or in cosmic rays causes breaks in DNA strands. Intermediate-level ionizing radiation may induce irreparable DNA damage (leading to replicational and transcriptional errors needed for neoplasia or may trigger viral interactions) leading to pre-mature aging and cancer.
4. Thermal disruption at elevated temperature increases the rate of depurination (loss of purine bases from the DNA backbone) and single-strand breaks. For example, hydrolytic depurination is seen in the thermophilic bacteria, which grow in hot springs at 40–80 °C. The rate of depurination (300 purine residues per genome per generation) is too high in these species to be repaired by normal repair machinery, hence a possibility of an adaptive response cannot be ruled out.
5. Industrial chemicals such as vinyl chloride and hydrogen peroxide, and environmental chemicals such as polycyclic aromatic hydrocarbons found in smoke, soot and tar create a huge diversity of DNA adducts- ethanoates, oxidized bases, alkylated phosphodiesters and crosslinking of DNA, just to name a few.

UV damage, alkylation/methylation, X-ray damage and oxidative damage are examples of induced damage. Spontaneous damage can include the loss of a base, deamination, sugar ring puckering and tautomeric shift. Constitutive (spontaneous) DNA damage caused by endogenous oxidants can be detected as a low level of histone H2AX phosphorylation in untreated cells.

=== Nuclear versus mitochondrial ===
In eukaryotic cells, DNA is found in two cellular locations – inside the nucleus and inside the mitochondria. Nuclear DNA (nDNA) exists as chromatin during non-replicative stages of the cell cycle and is condensed into aggregate structures known as chromosomes during cell division. In either state the DNA is highly compacted and wound up around bead-like proteins called histones. Whenever a cell needs to express the genetic information encoded in its nDNA the required chromosomal region is unraveled, genes located therein are expressed, and then the region is condensed back to its resting conformation. Mitochondrial DNA (mtDNA) is located inside mitochondria organelles, exists in multiple copies, and is also tightly associated with a number of proteins to form a complex known as the nucleoid. Inside mitochondria, reactive oxygen species (ROS), or free radicals, byproducts of the constant production of adenosine triphosphate (ATP) via oxidative phosphorylation, create a highly oxidative environment that is known to damage mtDNA. A critical enzyme in counteracting the toxicity of these species is superoxide dismutase, which is present in both the mitochondria and cytoplasm of eukaryotic cells.

=== Senescence and apoptosis ===
Senescence, an irreversible process in which the cell no longer divides, is a protective response to the shortening of the chromosome ends, called telomeres. The telomeres are long regions of repetitive noncoding DNA that cap chromosomes and undergo partial degradation each time a cell undergoes division (see Hayflick limit). In contrast, quiescence is a reversible state of cellular dormancy that is unrelated to genome damage (see cell cycle). Senescence in cells may serve as a functional alternative to apoptosis in cases where the physical presence of a cell for spatial reasons is required by the organism, which serves as a "last resort" mechanism to prevent a cell with damaged DNA from replicating inappropriately in the absence of pro-growth cellular signaling. Unregulated cell division can lead to the formation of a tumor (see cancer), which is potentially lethal to an organism. Therefore, the induction of senescence and apoptosis is considered to be part of a strategy of protection against cancer.

=== Mutation ===
It is important to distinguish between DNA damage and mutation, the two major types of error in DNA. DNA damage and mutation are fundamentally different. Damage results in physical abnormalities in the DNA, such as single- and double-strand breaks, 8-hydroxydeoxyguanosine residues, and polycyclic aromatic hydrocarbon adducts. DNA damage can be recognized by enzymes, and thus can be correctly repaired if redundant information, such as the undamaged sequence in the complementary DNA strand or in a homologous chromosome, is available for copying. If a cell retains DNA damage, transcription of a gene can be prevented, and thus translation into a protein will also be blocked. Replication may also be blocked or the cell may die.

In contrast to DNA damage, a mutation is a change in the base sequence of the DNA. A mutation cannot be recognized by enzymes once the base change is present in both DNA strands, and thus a mutation cannot be repaired. At the cellular level, mutations can cause alterations in protein function and regulation. Mutations are replicated when the cell replicates. In a population of cells, mutant cells will increase or decrease in frequency according to the effects of the mutation on the ability of the cell to survive and reproduce.

Although distinctly different from each other, DNA damage and mutation are related because DNA damage often causes errors of DNA synthesis during replication or repair; these errors are a major source of mutation.

Given these properties of DNA damage and mutation, it can be seen that DNA damage is a special problem in non-dividing or slowly-dividing cells, where unrepaired damage will tend to accumulate over time. On the other hand, in rapidly dividing cells, unrepaired DNA damage that does not kill the cell by blocking replication will tend to cause replication errors and thus mutation. The great majority of mutations that are not neutral in their effect are deleterious to a cell's survival. Thus, in a population of cells composing a tissue with replicating cells, mutant cells will tend to be lost. However, infrequent mutations that provide a survival advantage will tend to clonally expand at the expense of neighboring cells in the tissue. This advantage to the cell is disadvantageous to the whole organism because such mutant cells can give rise to cancer. Thus, DNA damage in frequently dividing cells, because it gives rise to mutations, is a prominent cause of cancer. In contrast, DNA damage in infrequently-dividing cells is likely a prominent cause of aging.

== Mechanisms ==
Cells cannot function if DNA damage corrupts the integrity and accessibility of essential information in the genome (but cells remain superficially functional when non-essential genes are missing or damaged). Depending on the type of damage inflicted on the DNA's double helical structure, a variety of repair strategies have evolved to restore lost information. If possible, cells use the unmodified complementary strand of the DNA or the sister chromatid as a template to recover the original information. Without access to a template, cells use an error-prone recovery mechanism known as translesion synthesis as a last resort.

Damage to DNA alters the spatial configuration of the helix, and such alterations can be detected by the cell. Once damage is localized, specific DNA repair molecules bind at or near the site of damage, inducing other molecules to bind and form a complex that enables the actual repair to take place.

=== Direct reversal ===
Cells are known to eliminate three types of damage to their DNA by chemically reversing it. These mechanisms do not require a template, since the types of damage they counteract can occur in only one of the four bases. Such direct reversal mechanisms are specific to the type of damage incurred and do not involve breakage of the phosphodiester backbone.

1. The formation of pyrimidine dimers upon irradiation with UV light results in an abnormal covalent bond between adjacent pyrimidine bases. The photoreactivation process directly reverses this damage by the action of the enzyme photolyase, whose activation is obligately dependent on energy absorbed from blue/UV light (300–500 nm wavelength) to promote catalysis. Photolyase, an old enzyme present in bacteria, fungi, and most animals no longer functions in humans, who instead use nucleotide excision repair to repair damage from UV irradiation.
2. Another type of damage, methylation of guanine bases, is directly reversed by the enzyme methyl guanine methyl transferase (MGMT), the bacterial equivalent of which is called ogt. This is an expensive process because each MGMT molecule can be used only once; that is, the reaction is stoichiometric rather than catalytic. A generalized response to methylating agents in bacteria is known as the adaptive response and confers a level of resistance to alkylating agents upon sustained exposure by upregulation of alkylation repair enzymes.
3. The third type of DNA damage reversed by cells is certain methylation of the bases cytosine and adenine.

=== Single-strand damage ===
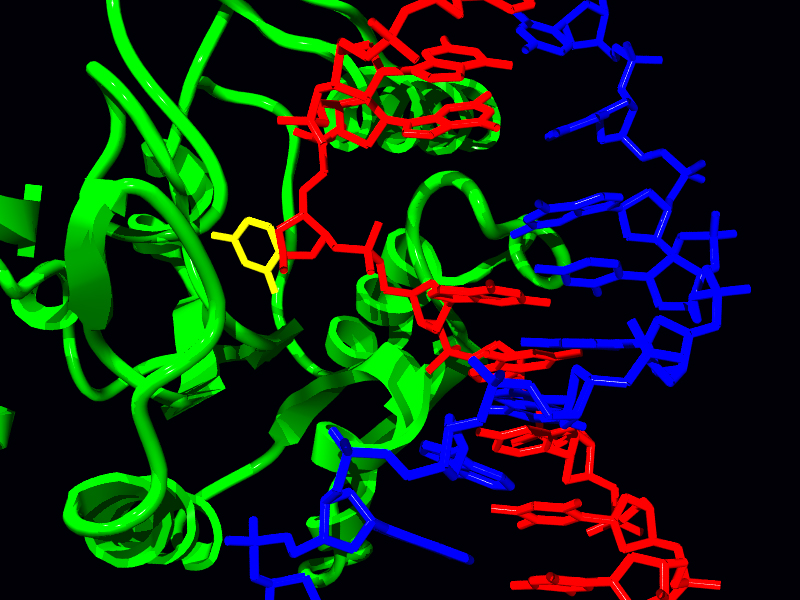
Structure of the base-excision repair enzyme uracil-DNA glycosylase excising a hydrolytically produced uracil residue from DNA. The uracil residue is shown in yellow.

When only one of the two strands of a double helix has a defect, the other strand can be used as a template to guide the correction of the damaged strand. In order to repair damage to one of the two paired molecules of DNA, there exist a number of excision repair mechanisms that remove the damaged nucleotide and replace it with an undamaged nucleotide complementary to that found in the undamaged DNA strand.

1. Base excision repair (BER): damaged single bases or nucleotides are most commonly repaired by removing the base or the nucleotide involved and then inserting the correct base or nucleotide. In base excision repair, a glycosylase enzyme removes the damaged base from the DNA by cleaving the bond between the base and the deoxyribose. These enzymes remove a single base to create an apurinic or apyrimidinic site (AP site). Enzymes called AP endonucleases nick the damaged DNA backbone at the AP site. DNA polymerase then removes the damaged region using its 5' to 3' exonuclease activity and correctly synthesizes the new strand using the complementary strand as a template. The gap is then sealed by enzyme DNA ligase.
2. Nucleotide excision repair (NER): bulky, helix-distorting damage, such as pyrimidine dimerization caused by UV light is usually repaired by a three-step process. First the damage is recognized, then 12-24 nucleotide-long strands of DNA are removed both upstream and downstream of the damage site by endonucleases, and the removed DNA region is then resynthesized. NER is a highly evolutionarily conserved repair mechanism and is used in nearly all eukaryotic and prokaryotic cells. In prokaryotes, NER is mediated by Uvr proteins. In eukaryotes, many more proteins are involved, although the general strategy is the same.
3. Mismatch repair systems are present in essentially all cells to correct errors that are not corrected by proofreading. These systems consist of at least two proteins. One detects the mismatch, and the other recruits an endonuclease that cleaves the newly synthesized DNA strand close to the region of damage. In E. coli, the proteins involved are the Mut class proteins: MutS, MutL, and MutH. In most Eukaryotes, the analog for MutS is MSH and the analog for MutL is MLH. MutH is only present in bacteria. This is followed by removal of damaged region by an exonuclease, resynthesis by DNA polymerase, and nick sealing by DNA ligase.

=== Double-strand breaks ===
The main double-strand break repair pathways

Double-strand breaks, in which both strands in the double helix are severed, are particularly hazardous to the cell because they can lead to genome rearrangements. In fact, when a double-strand break is accompanied by a cross-linkage joining the two strands at the same point, neither strand can be used as a template for the repair mechanisms, so that the cell will not be able to complete mitosis when it next divides, and will either die or, in rare cases, undergo a mutation. Three mechanisms exist to repair double-strand breaks (DSBs): non-homologous end joining (NHEJ), microhomology-mediated end joining (MMEJ), and homologous recombination (HR):

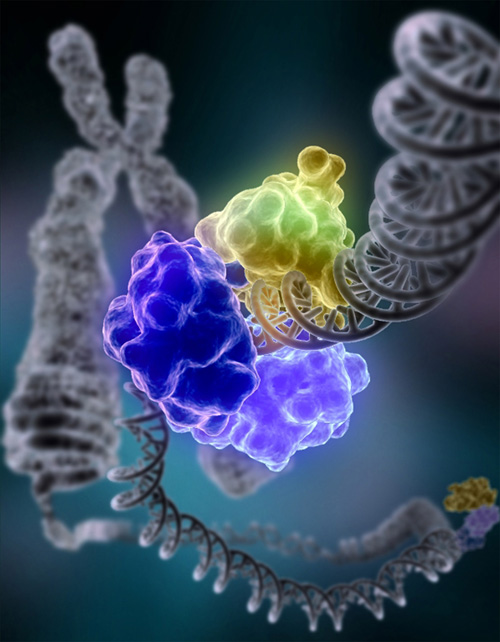
DNA ligase, shown above repairing chromosomal damage, is an enzyme that joins broken nucleotides together by catalyzing the formation of an internucleotide ester bond between the phosphate backbone and the deoxyribose nucleotides.

1. In NHEJ, DNA Ligase IV, a specialized DNA ligase that forms a complex with the cofactor XRCC4, directly joins the two ends. To guide accurate repair, NHEJ relies on short homologous sequences called microhomologies present on the single-stranded tails of the DNA ends to be joined. If these overhangs are compatible, repair is usually accurate. NHEJ can also introduce mutations during repair. Loss of damaged nucleotides at the break site can lead to deletions, and joining of nonmatching termini forms insertions or translocations. NHEJ is especially important before the cell has replicated its DNA, since there is no template available for repair by homologous recombination. There are "backup" NHEJ pathways in higher eukaryotes. Besides its role as a genome caretaker, NHEJ is required for joining hairpin-capped double-strand breaks induced during V(D)J recombination, the process that generates diversity in B-cell and T-cell receptors in the vertebrate immune system.
2. MMEJ starts with short-range end resection by MRE11 nuclease on either side of a double-strand break to reveal microhomology regions. In further steps, Poly (ADP-ribose) polymerase 1 (PARP1) is required and may be an early step in MMEJ. There is pairing of microhomology regions followed by recruitment of flap structure-specific endonuclease 1 (FEN1) to remove overhanging flaps. This is followed by recruitment of XRCC1–LIG3 to the site for ligating the DNA ends, leading to an intact DNA. MMEJ is always accompanied by a deletion, so that MMEJ is a mutagenic pathway for DNA repair.
3. HR requires the presence of an identical or nearly identical sequence to be used as a template for repair of the break. The enzymatic machinery responsible for this repair process is nearly identical to the machinery responsible for chromosomal crossover during meiosis. This pathway allows a damaged chromosome to be repaired using a sister chromatid (available in G2 after DNA replication) or a homologous chromosome as a template. DSBs caused by the replication machinery attempting to synthesize across a single-strand break or unrepaired lesion cause collapse of the replication fork and are typically repaired by recombination.

In an in vitro system, MMEJ occurred in mammalian cells at the levels of 10–20% of HR when both HR and NHEJ mechanisms were also available.

The extremophile Deinococcus radiodurans has a remarkable ability to survive DNA damage from ionizing radiation and other sources. At least two copies of the genome, with random DNA breaks, can form DNA fragments through annealing. Partially overlapping fragments are then used for synthesis of homologous regions through a moving D-loop that can continue extension until complementary partner strands are found. In the final step, there is crossover by means of RecA-dependent homologous recombination.

Topoisomerases introduce both single- and double-strand breaks in the course of changing the DNA's state of supercoiling, which is especially common in regions near an open replication fork. Such breaks are not considered DNA damage because they are a natural intermediate in the topoisomerase biochemical mechanism and are immediately repaired by the enzymes that created them.

Another type of DNA double-strand breaks originates from the DNA heat-sensitive or heat-labile sites. These DNA sites are not initial DSBs. However, they convert to DSB after treating with elevated temperature. Ionizing irradiation can induce a highly complex form of DNA damage as clustered damage. It consists of different types of DNA lesions in various locations of the DNA helix. Some of these closely located lesions can probably convert to DSB by exposure to high temperatures. But the exact nature of these lesions and their interactions is not yet known.

=== Translesion synthesis ===
Translesion synthesis (TLS) is a DNA damage tolerance process that allows the DNA replication machinery to replicate past DNA lesions such as thymine dimers or AP sites. It involves switching out regular DNA polymerases for specialized translesion polymerases (i.e. DNA polymerase IV or V, from the Y Polymerase family), often with larger active sites that can facilitate the insertion of bases opposite damaged nucleotides. The polymerase switching is thought to be mediated by, among other factors, the post-translational modification of the replication processivity factor PCNA. Translesion synthesis polymerases often have low fidelity (high propensity to insert wrong bases) on undamaged templates relative to regular polymerases. However, many are extremely efficient at inserting correct bases opposite specific types of damage. For example, Pol η mediates error-free bypass of lesions induced by UV irradiation, whereas Pol ι introduces mutations at these sites. Pol η is known to add the first adenine across the T^T photodimer using Watson-Crick base pairing and the second adenine will be added in its syn conformation using Hoogsteen base pairing. From a cellular perspective, risking the introduction of point mutations during translesion synthesis may be preferable to resorting to more drastic mechanisms of DNA repair, which may cause gross chromosomal aberrations or cell death. In short, the process involves specialized polymerases either bypassing or repairing lesions at locations of stalled DNA replication. For example, Human DNA polymerase eta can bypass complex DNA lesions like guanine-thymine intra-strand crosslink, G[8,5-Me]T, although it can cause targeted and semi-targeted mutations. Paromita Raychaudhury and Ashis Basu studied the toxicity and mutagenesis of the same lesion in Escherichia coli by replicating a G[8,5-Me]T-modified plasmid in E. coli with specific DNA polymerase knockouts. Viability was very low in a strain lacking pol II, pol IV, and pol V, the three SOS-inducible DNA polymerases, indicating that translesion synthesis is conducted primarily by these specialized DNA polymerases. A bypass platform is provided to these polymerases by Proliferating cell nuclear antigen (PCNA). Under normal circumstances, PCNA bound to polymerases replicates the DNA. At a site of lesion, PCNA is ubiquitinated, or modified, by the RAD6/RAD18 proteins to provide a platform for the specialized polymerases to bypass the lesion and resume DNA replication. After translesion synthesis, extension is required. This extension can be carried out by a replicative polymerase if the TLS is error-free, as in the case of Pol η, yet if TLS results in a mismatch, a specialized polymerase is needed to extend it; Pol ζ. Pol ζ is unique in that it can extend terminal mismatches, whereas more processive polymerases cannot. So when a lesion is encountered, the replication fork will stall, PCNA will switch from a processive polymerase to a TLS polymerase such as Pol ι to fix the lesion, then PCNA may switch to Pol ζ to extend the mismatch, and last PCNA will switch to the processive polymerase to continue replication.

== Global response to DNA damage ==
Cells exposed to ionizing radiation, ultraviolet light or chemicals are prone to acquire multiple sites of bulky DNA lesions and double-strand breaks. Moreover, DNA damaging agents can damage other biomolecules such as proteins, carbohydrates, lipids, and RNA. The accumulation of damage, to be specific, double-strand breaks or adducts stalling the replication forks, are among known stimulation signals for a global response to DNA damage. The global response to damage is an act directed toward the cells' own preservation and triggers multiple pathways of macromolecular repair, lesion bypass, tolerance, or apoptosis. The common features of global response are induction of multiple genes, cell cycle arrest, and inhibition of cell division.

=== Initial steps ===
The packaging of eukaryotic DNA into chromatin presents a barrier to all DNA-based processes that require recruitment of enzymes to their sites of action. To allow DNA repair, the chromatin must be remodeled. In eukaryotes, ATP dependent chromatin remodeling complexes and histone-modifying enzymes are two predominant factors employed to accomplish this remodeling process.

Chromatin relaxation occurs rapidly at the site of a DNA damage. In one of the earliest steps, the stress-activated protein kinase, c-Jun N-terminal kinase (JNK), phosphorylates SIRT6 on serine 10 in response to double-strand breaks or other DNA damage. This post-translational modification facilitates the mobilization of SIRT6 to DNA damage sites, and is required for efficient recruitment of poly (ADP-ribose) polymerase 1 (PARP1) to DNA break sites and for efficient repair of DSBs. PARP1 protein starts to appear at DNA damage sites in less than a second, with half maximum accumulation within 1.6 seconds after the damage occurs. PARP1 synthesizes polymeric adenosine diphosphate ribose (poly (ADP-ribose) or PAR) chains on itself. Next the chromatin remodeler ALC1 quickly attaches to the product of PARP1 action, a poly-ADP ribose chain, and ALC1 completes arrival at the DNA damage within 10 seconds of the occurrence of the damage. About half of the maximum chromatin relaxation, presumably due to action of ALC1, occurs by 10 seconds. This then allows recruitment of the DNA repair enzyme MRE11, to initiate DNA repair, within 13 seconds.

γH2AX, the phosphorylated form of H2AX is also involved in the early steps leading to chromatin decondensation after DNA double-strand breaks. The histone variant H2AX constitutes about 10% of the H2A histones in human chromatin. γH2AX (H2AX phosphorylated on serine 139) can be detected as soon as 20 seconds after irradiation of cells (with DNA double-strand break formation), and half maximum accumulation of γH2AX occurs in one minute. The extent of chromatin with phosphorylated γH2AX is about two million base pairs at the site of a DNA double-strand break. γH2AX does not, itself, cause chromatin decondensation, but within 30 seconds of irradiation, RNF8 protein can be detected in association with γH2AX. RNF8 mediates extensive chromatin decondensation, through its subsequent interaction with CHD4, a component of the nucleosome remodeling and deacetylase complex NuRD.

DDB2 occurs in a heterodimeric complex with DDB1. This complex further complexes with the ubiquitin ligase protein CUL4A and with PARP1. This larger complex rapidly associates with UV-induced damage within chromatin, with half-maximum association completed in 40 seconds. The PARP1 protein, attached to both DDB1 and DDB2, then PARylates (creates a poly-ADP ribose chain) on DDB2 that attracts the DNA remodeling protein ALC1. Action of ALC1 relaxes the chromatin at the site of UV damage to DNA. This relaxation allows other proteins in the nucleotide excision repair pathway to enter the chromatin and repair UV-induced cyclobutane pyrimidine dimer damages.

After rapid chromatin remodeling, cell cycle checkpoints are activated to allow DNA repair to occur before the cell cycle progresses. First, two kinases, ATM and ATR are activated within 5 or 6 minutes after DNA is damaged. This is followed by phosphorylation of the cell cycle checkpoint protein Chk1, initiating its function, about 10 minutes after DNA is damaged.

=== DNA damage response ===
When DNA is damaged, the DNA damage response (DDR) activates cell cycle checkpoints, which are signal transduction pathways that block cell cycle progression in G1, G2 and metaphase and slows down the rate of S phase progression. It leads to a pause in the cell cycle that allows the cell time to repair the damage before continuing to divide. DNA damage checkpoints occur at the G1/S and G2/M boundaries. An intra-S checkpoint also exists.

Checkpoint activation is controlled by two master kinases, ataxia telangiectasia mutated (ATM) and Ataxia Telangiectasia and Rad3 related (ATR). ATM responds to DNA double-strand breaks and disruptions in chromatin structure, whereas ATR primarily responds to stalled replication forks. These kinases phosphorylate downstream targets in a signal transduction cascade, eventually leading to cell cycle arrest.

Checkpoint proteins can be separated into four groups: phosphatidylinositol 3-kinase (PI3K)-like protein kinases, the proliferating cell nuclear antigen (PCNA)-like group, two serine/threonine(S/T) kinases and their adaptors. A class of checkpoint mediator proteins including BRCA1, MDC1, and 53BP1 has also been identified. These proteins seem to be required for transmitting the checkpoint activation signal to downstream proteins.

Central to all DNA damage induced checkpoints responses is a pair of large protein kinases belonging to the first group of PI3K-like protein kinases: the ATM (Ataxia telangiectasia mutated) and ATR (Ataxia telangiectasia and Rad3 related) kinases, whose sequence and functions have been well conserved in evolution. All DNA damage response requires either ATM or ATR because they have the ability to bind to the chromosomes at the site of DNA damage, together with accessory proteins that are platforms on which DNA damage response components and DNA repair complexes can be assembled.

An important downstream target of ATM and ATR is p53, as it is required for inducing apoptosis following DNA damage. The cyclin-dependent kinase inhibitor p21 is induced by both p53-dependent and p53-independent mechanisms and can arrest the cell cycle at the G1/S and G2/M checkpoints by deactivating cyclin/cyclin-dependent kinase complexes.

=== The prokaryotic SOS response ===
The SOS response is the changes in gene expression in Escherichia coli and other bacteria in response to extensive DNA damage. The prokaryotic SOS system is regulated by two key proteins: LexA and RecA. The LexA homodimer is a transcriptional repressor that binds to operator sequences commonly referred to as SOS boxes. In Escherichia coli it is known that LexA regulates transcription of approximately 48 genes including the lexA and recA genes. The SOS response is known to be widespread in the Bacteria domain, but it is mostly absent in some bacterial phyla, like the Spirochetes. The most common cellular signals activating the SOS response are regions of single-stranded DNA (ssDNA), arising from stalled replication forks or double-strand breaks, which are processed by DNA helicase to separate the two DNA strands. In the initiation step, RecA protein binds to ssDNA in an ATP hydrolysis driven reaction creating RecA–ssDNA filaments. RecA–ssDNA filaments activate LexA autoprotease activity, which ultimately leads to cleavage of LexA dimer and subsequent LexA degradation. The loss of LexA repressor induces transcription of the SOS genes and allows for further signal induction, inhibition of cell division and an increase in levels of proteins responsible for damage processing.

In Escherichia coli, SOS boxes are 20-nucleotide long sequences near promoters with palindromic structure and a high degree of sequence conservation. In other classes and phyla, the sequence of SOS boxes varies considerably, with different length and composition, but it is always highly conserved and one of the strongest short signals in the genome. The high information content of SOS boxes permits differential binding of LexA to different promoters and allows for timing of the SOS response. The lesion repair genes are induced at the beginning of SOS response. The error-prone translesion polymerases, for example, UmuCD'2 (also called DNA polymerase V), are induced later on as a last resort. Once the DNA damage is repaired or bypassed using polymerases or through recombination, the amount of single-stranded DNA in cells is decreased, lowering the amounts of RecA filaments decreases cleavage activity of LexA homodimer, which then binds to the SOS boxes near promoters and restores normal gene expression.

=== Eukaryotic transcriptional responses to DNA damage ===
Eukaryotic cells exposed to DNA damaging agents also activate important defensive pathways by inducing multiple proteins involved in DNA repair, cell cycle checkpoint control, protein trafficking and degradation. Such genome wide transcriptional response is very complex and tightly regulated, thus allowing coordinated global response to damage. Exposure of yeast Saccharomyces cerevisiae to DNA damaging agents results in overlapping but distinct transcriptional profiles. Similarities to environmental shock response indicates that a general global stress response pathway exist at the level of transcriptional activation. In contrast, different human cell types respond to damage differently indicating an absence of a common global response. The probable explanation for this difference between yeast and human cells may be in the heterogeneity of mammalian cells. In an animal different types of cells are distributed among different organs that have evolved different sensitivities to DNA damage.

In general global response to DNA damage involves expression of multiple genes responsible for postreplication repair, homologous recombination, nucleotide excision repair, DNA damage checkpoint, global transcriptional activation, genes controlling mRNA decay, and many others. A large amount of damage to a cell leaves it with an important decision: undergo apoptosis and die, or survive at the cost of living with a modified genome. An increase in tolerance to damage can lead to an increased rate of survival that will allow a greater accumulation of mutations. Yeast Rev1 and human polymerase η are members of Y family translesion DNA polymerases present during global response to DNA damage and are responsible for enhanced mutagenesis during a global response to DNA damage in eukaryotes.

== Aging ==
=== Pathological effects of poor DNA repair ===
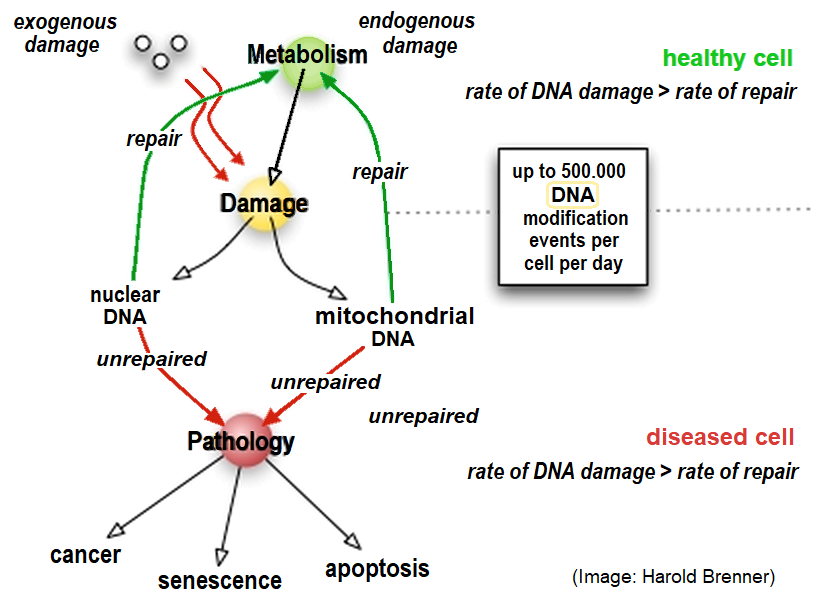
DNA repair rate is an important determinant of cell pathology.

Experimental animals with genetic deficiencies in DNA repair often show decreased life span and increased cancer incidence. For example, mice deficient in the dominant NHEJ pathway and in telomere maintenance mechanisms get lymphoma and infections more often, and, as a consequence, have shorter lifespans than wild-type mice. In similar manner, mice deficient in a key repair and transcription protein that unwinds DNA helices have premature onset of aging-related diseases and consequent shortening of lifespan. However, not every DNA repair deficiency creates exactly the predicted effects; mice deficient in the NER pathway exhibited shortened life span without correspondingly higher rates of mutation.

The maximum life spans of mice, naked mole-rats and humans are respectively ~3, ~30 and ~129 years. Of these, the shortest lived species, mouse, expresses DNA repair genes, including core genes in several DNA repair pathways, at a lower level than do humans and naked mole rats. Furthermore, several DNA repair pathways in humans and naked mole-rats are up-regulated compared to mice. These observations suggest that elevated DNA repair facilitates greater longevity.

If the rate of DNA damage exceeds the capacity of the cell to repair it, the accumulation of errors can overwhelm the cell and result in early senescence, apoptosis, or cancer. Inherited diseases associated with faulty DNA repair functioning result in premature aging, increased sensitivity to carcinogens and correspondingly increased cancer risk (see below). On the other hand, organisms with enhanced DNA repair systems, such as Deinococcus radiodurans, the most radiation-resistant known organism, exhibit remarkable resistance to the double-strand break-inducing effects of radioactivity, likely due to enhanced efficiency of DNA repair and especially NHEJ.

=== Longevity and caloric restriction ===
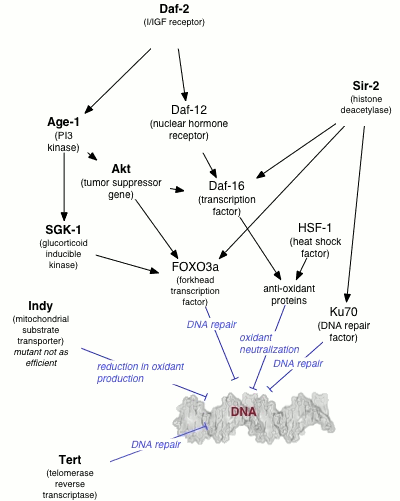
Most life span influencing genes affect the rate of DNA damage.

A number of individual genes have been identified as influencing variations in life span within a population of organisms. The effects of these genes are strongly dependent on the environment, in particular, on the organism's diet. Caloric restriction reproducibly results in extended lifespan in a variety of organisms, likely via nutrient sensing pathways and decreased metabolic rate. The molecular mechanisms by which such restriction results in lengthened lifespan are as yet unclear (see for some discussion); however, the behavior of many genes known to be involved in DNA repair is altered under conditions of caloric restriction. Several agents reported to have anti-aging properties have been shown to attenuate constitutive level of mTOR signaling, an evidence of reduction of metabolic activity, and concurrently to reduce constitutive level of DNA damage induced by endogenously generated reactive oxygen species.

For example, increasing the gene dosage of the gene SIR-2, which regulates DNA packaging in the nematode worm Caenorhabditis elegans, can significantly extend lifespan. The mammalian homolog of SIR-2 (Sirtuin 1) is known to induce downstream DNA repair factors involved in NHEJ, an activity that is especially promoted under conditions of caloric restriction. Caloric restriction has been closely linked to the rate of base excision repair in the nuclear DNA of rodents, although similar effects have not been observed in mitochondrial DNA.

The C. elegans gene AGE-1, an upstream effector of DNA repair pathways, confers dramatically extended life span under free-feeding conditions but leads to a decrease in reproductive fitness under conditions of caloric restriction. This observation supports the pleiotropy theory of the biological origins of aging, which suggests that genes conferring a large survival advantage early in life will be selected for even if they carry a corresponding disadvantage late in life.

== Medicine and DNA repair modulation ==
=== Hereditary DNA repair disorders ===
Defects in the NER mechanism are responsible for several genetic disorders, including:

- Xeroderma pigmentosum: hypersensitivity to sunlight/UV, resulting in increased skin cancer incidence and premature aging
- Cockayne syndrome: hypersensitivity to UV and chemical agents
- Trichothiodystrophy: sensitive skin, brittle hair and nails

Intellectual disability often accompanies the latter two disorders, suggesting increased vulnerability of developmental neurons.

Other DNA repair disorders include:

- Werner syndrome: premature aging and delayed growth
- Bloom syndrome: sunlight hypersensitivity, high incidence of malignancies (especially leukemias).
- Ataxia telangiectasia: sensitivity to ionizing radiation and some chemical agents

All of the above diseases are often called "segmental progerias" ("accelerated aging diseases") because those affected appear elderly and experience aging-related diseases at an abnormally young age, while not manifesting all the symptoms of old age.

Other diseases associated with reduced DNA repair function include Fanconi anemia, hereditary breast cancer and hereditary colon cancer.

== Cancer ==
Because of inherent limitations in the DNA repair mechanisms, if humans lived long enough, they would all eventually develop cancer. There are at least 34 Inherited human DNA repair gene mutations that increase cancer risk. Many of these mutations cause DNA repair to be less effective than normal. In particular, Hereditary nonpolyposis colorectal cancer (HNPCC) is strongly associated with specific mutations in the DNA mismatch repair pathway. BRCA1 and BRCA2, two important genes whose mutations confer a hugely increased risk of breast cancer on carriers, are both associated with a large number of DNA repair pathways, especially NHEJ and homologous recombination.

Cancer therapy procedures such as chemotherapy and radiotherapy work by overwhelming the capacity of the cell to repair DNA damage, resulting in cell death. Cells that are most rapidly dividing – most typically cancer cells – are preferentially affected. The side-effect is that other non-cancerous but rapidly dividing cells such as progenitor cells in the gut, skin, and hematopoietic system are also affected. Modern cancer treatments attempt to localize the DNA damage to cells and tissues only associated with cancer, either by physical means (concentrating the therapeutic agent in the region of the tumor) or by biochemical means (exploiting a feature unique to cancer cells in the body). In the context of therapies targeting DNA damage response genes, the latter approach has been termed 'synthetic lethality'.

Perhaps the most well-known of these 'synthetic lethality' drugs is the poly(ADP-ribose) polymerase 1 (PARP1) inhibitor olaparib, which was approved by the Food and Drug Administration in 2015 for the treatment in women of BRCA-defective ovarian cancer. Tumor cells with partial loss of DNA damage response (specifically, homologous recombination repair) are dependent on another mechanism – single-strand break repair – which is a mechanism consisting, in part, of the PARP1 gene product. Olaparib is combined with chemotherapeutics to inhibit single-strand break repair induced by DNA damage caused by the co-administered chemotherapy. Tumor cells relying on this residual DNA repair mechanism are unable to repair the damage and hence are not able to survive and proliferate, whereas normal cells can repair the damage with the functioning homologous recombination mechanism.

Many other drugs for use against other residual DNA repair mechanisms commonly found in cancer are currently under investigation. However, synthetic lethality therapeutic approaches have been questioned due to emerging evidence of acquired resistance, achieved through rewiring of DNA damage response pathways and reversion of previously inhibited defects.

=== DNA repair defects in cancer ===
Studies have shown that the DNA damage response acts as a barrier to the malignant transformation of preneoplastic cells. Early studies have shown an elevated DNA damage response in cell-culture models with oncogene activation, and preneoplastic colon adenomas. DNA damage response mechanisms trigger cell-cycle arrest, and attempt to repair DNA lesions or promote cell death/senescence if repair is not possible. Replication stress is observed in preneoplastic cells due to increased proliferation signals from oncogenic mutations. Replication stress is characterized by: increased replication initiation/origin firing; increased transcription and collisions of transcription-replication complexes; nucleotide deficiency; increase in reactive oxygen species (ROS).

Replication stress, along with the selection for inactivating mutations in DNA damage response genes in the evolution of the tumor, leads to downregulation and/or loss of some DNA damage response mechanisms, and hence loss of DNA repair and/or senescence/programmed cell death. In experimental mouse models, loss of DNA damage response-mediated cell senescence was observed after using a short hairpin RNA (shRNA) to inhibit the double-strand break response kinase ataxia telangiectasia (ATM), leading to increased tumor size and invasiveness. Humans born with inherited defects in DNA repair mechanisms (for example, Li-Fraumeni syndrome) have a higher cancer risk.

The prevalence of DNA damage response mutations differs across cancer types; for example, 30% of breast invasive carcinomas have mutations in genes involved in homologous recombination. In cancer, downregulation is observed across all DNA damage response mechanisms (base excision repair (BER), nucleotide excision repair (NER), DNA mismatch repair (MMR), homologous recombinational repair (HRR), non-homologous end joining (NHEJ) and translesion DNA synthesis (TLS). As well as mutations to DNA damage repair genes, mutations also arise in the genes responsible for arresting the cell cycle to allow sufficient time for DNA repair to occur, and some genes are involved in both DNA damage repair and cell cycle checkpoint control, for example ATM and checkpoint kinase 2 (CHEK2) – a tumor suppressor that is often absent or downregulated in non-small cell lung cancer.

Genes involved in DNA damage response pathways and frequently mutated in cancer
	HR (Note: homologous recombination)	NHEJ (Note: non-homologous end joining)	SSA (Note: single-strand annealing)	FA (Note: fanconi anemia pathway)	BER (Note: base excision repair)	NER (Note: nucleotide excision repair)	MMR (Note: mismatch repair)
ATM	Yes	Yes	Yes				
ATR	Yes	Yes	Yes				
PAXIP	Yes	Yes					
RPA	Yes		Yes			Yes	
BRCA1	Yes			Yes			
BRCA2	Yes			Yes			
RAD51	Yes			Yes			
RFC	Yes				Yes	Yes	
XRCC1					Yes	Yes	
PCNA					Yes	Yes	Yes
PARP1		Yes			Yes		
ERCC1	Yes		Yes	Yes		Yes	
MSH3	Yes		Yes				Yes

=== Epigenetic DNA repair defects in cancer ===
Classically, cancer has been viewed as a set of diseases that are driven by progressive genetic abnormalities that include mutations in tumour-suppressor genes and oncogenes, and chromosomal aberrations. However, it has become apparent that cancer is also driven by epigenetic alterations.

Epigenetic alterations refer to functionally relevant modifications to the genome that do not involve a change in the nucleotide sequence. Examples of such modifications are changes in DNA methylation (hypermethylation and hypomethylation) and histone modification, changes in chromosomal architecture (caused by inappropriate expression of proteins such as HMGA2 or HMGA1) and changes caused by microRNAs. Each of these epigenetic alterations serves to regulate gene expression without altering the underlying DNA sequence. These changes usually remain through cell divisions, last for multiple cell generations, and can be considered to be epimutations (equivalent to mutations).

While large numbers of epigenetic alterations are found in cancers, the epigenetic alterations in DNA repair genes, causing reduced expression of DNA repair proteins, appear to be particularly important. Such alterations are thought to occur early in progression to cancer and to be a likely cause of the genetic instability characteristic of cancers. In addition to direct promoter methylation or histone-associated silencing of repair genes, defects in chromatin remodeling complexes can also impair DNA repair capacity. In particular, SWI/SNF chromatin-remodeling complexes have been shown to participate in the repair of DNA double-strand breaks by promoting both homologous recombination (HR) and non-homologous end joining (NHEJ). These complexes facilitate DNA repair by regulating chromatin accessibility at sites of damage and by enabling the recruitment of essential repair factors, including RAD51, Ku70, and Ku80, to double-strand breaks. Such chromatin-based mechanisms illustrate how epigenetic dysregulation can directly affect cellular DNA repair pathways and contribute to genomic instability.

Reduced expression of DNA repair genes causes deficient DNA repair. When DNA repair is deficient DNA damages remain in cells at a higher than usual level and these excess damages cause increased frequencies of mutation or epimutation. Mutation rates increase substantially in cells defective in DNA mismatch repair or in homologous recombinational repair (HRR). Chromosomal rearrangements and aneuploidy also increase in HRR defective cells.

Higher levels of DNA damage not only cause increased mutation, but also cause increased epimutation. During repair of DNA double strand breaks, or repair of other DNA damages, incompletely cleared sites of repair can cause epigenetic gene silencing.

Deficient expression of DNA repair proteins due to an inherited mutation can cause increased risk of cancer. Individuals with an inherited impairment in any of 34 DNA repair genes (see article DNA repair-deficiency disorder) have an increased risk of cancer, with some defects causing up to a 100% lifetime chance of cancer (e.g. p53 mutations). However, such germline mutations (which cause highly penetrant cancer syndromes) are the cause of only about 1 percent of cancers.

=== Frequencies of epimutations in DNA repair genes ===
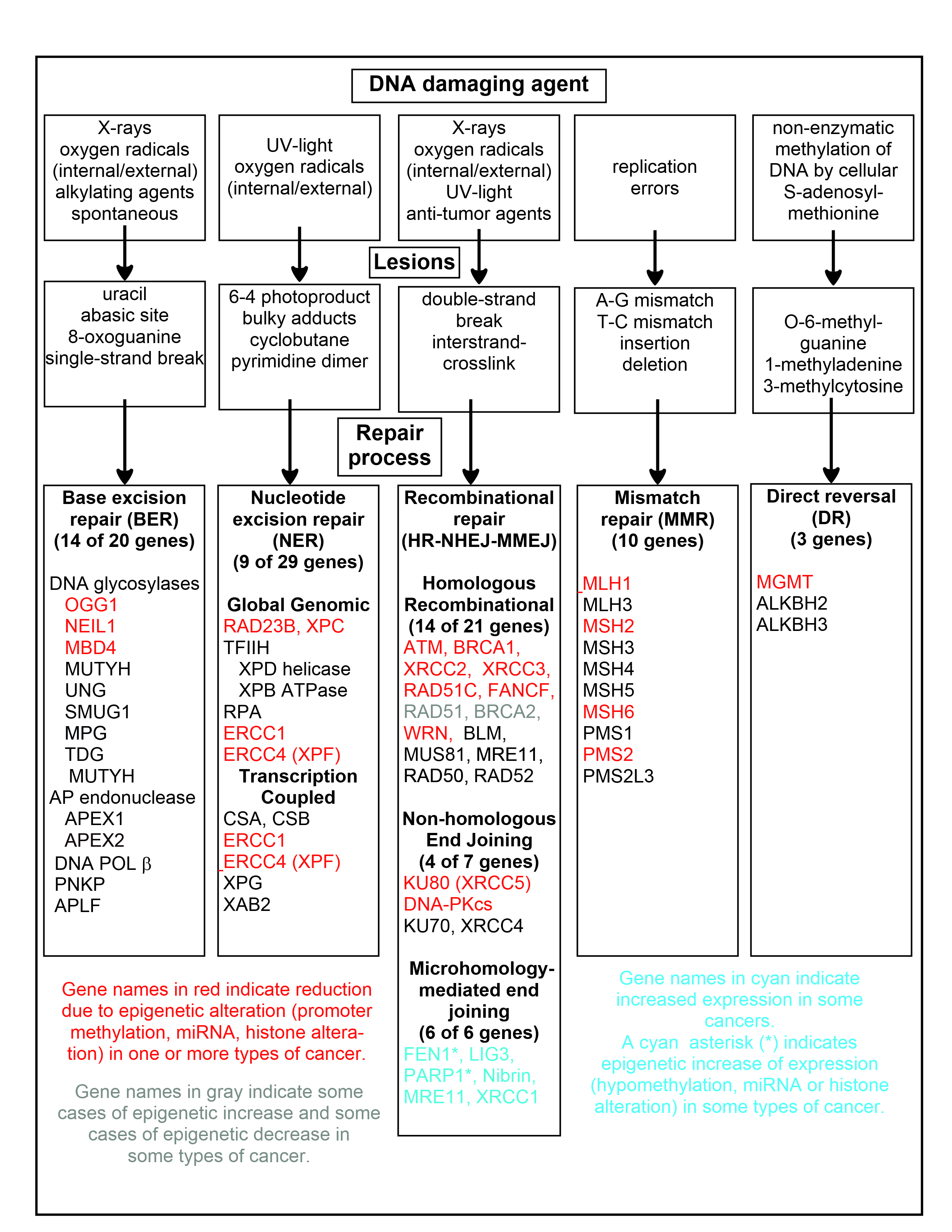
A chart of common DNA damaging agents, examples of lesions they cause in DNA, and pathways used to repair these lesions. Also shown are many of the genes in these pathways, an indication of which genes are epigenetically regulated to have reduced (or increased) expression in various cancers. It also shows genes in the error-prone microhomology-mediated end joining pathway with increased expression in various cancers.

Deficiencies in DNA repair enzymes are occasionally caused by a newly arising somatic mutation in a DNA repair gene, but are much more frequently caused by epigenetic alterations that reduce or silence expression of DNA repair genes. For example, when 113 colorectal cancers were examined in sequence, only four had a missense mutation in the DNA repair gene MGMT, while the majority had reduced MGMT expression due to methylation of the MGMT promoter region (an epigenetic alteration). Five different studies found that between 40% and 90% of colorectal cancers have reduced MGMT expression due to methylation of the MGMT promoter region.

Similarly, out of 119 cases of mismatch repair-deficient colorectal cancers that lacked DNA repair gene PMS2 expression, PMS2 was deficient in 6 due to mutations in the PMS2 gene, while in 103 cases PMS2 expression was deficient because its pairing partner MLH1 was repressed due to promoter methylation (PMS2 protein is unstable in the absence of MLH1). In the other 10 cases, loss of PMS2 expression was likely due to epigenetic overexpression of the microRNA, miR-155, which down-regulates MLH1.

In a further example, epigenetic defects were found in various cancers (e.g. breast, ovarian, colorectal and head and neck). Two or three deficiencies in the expression of ERCC1, XPF or PMS2 occur simultaneously in the majority of 49 colon cancers evaluated by Facista et al.

The chart in this section shows some frequent DNA damaging agents, examples of DNA lesions they cause, and the pathways that deal with these DNA damages. At least 169 enzymes are either directly employed in DNA repair or influence DNA repair processes. Of these, 83 are directly employed in repairing the 5 types of DNA damages illustrated in the chart.

Some of the more well studied genes central to these repair processes are shown in the chart. The gene designations shown in red, gray or cyan indicate genes frequently epigenetically altered in various types of cancers. Wikipedia articles on each of the genes highlighted by red, gray or cyan describe the epigenetic alteration(s) and the cancer(s) in which these epimutations are found. Review articles, and broad experimental survey articles also document most of these epigenetic DNA repair deficiencies in cancers.

Red-highlighted genes are frequently reduced or silenced by epigenetic mechanisms in various cancers. When these genes have low or absent expression, DNA damages can accumulate. Replication errors past these damages (see translesion synthesis) can lead to increased mutations and, ultimately, cancer. Epigenetic repression of DNA repair genes in accurate DNA repair pathways appear to be central to carcinogenesis.

The two gray-highlighted genes RAD51 and BRCA2, are required for homologous recombinational repair. They are sometimes epigenetically over-expressed and sometimes under-expressed in certain cancers. As indicated in the Wikipedia articles on RAD51 and BRCA2, such cancers ordinarily have epigenetic deficiencies in other DNA repair genes. These repair deficiencies would likely cause increased unrepaired DNA damages. The over-expression of RAD51 and BRCA2 seen in these cancers may reflect selective pressures for compensatory RAD51 or BRCA2 over-expression and increased homologous recombinational repair to at least partially deal with such excess DNA damages. In those cases where RAD51 or BRCA2 are under-expressed, this would itself lead to increased unrepaired DNA damages. Replication errors past these damages (see translesion synthesis) could cause increased mutations and cancer, so that under-expression of RAD51 or BRCA2 would be carcinogenic in itself.

Cyan-highlighted genes are in the microhomology-mediated end joining (MMEJ) pathway and are up-regulated in cancer. MMEJ is an additional error-prone inaccurate repair pathway for double-strand breaks. In MMEJ repair of a double-strand break, an homology of 5–25 complementary base pairs between both paired strands is sufficient to align the strands, but mismatched ends (flaps) are usually present. MMEJ removes the extra nucleotides (flaps) where strands are joined, and then ligates the strands to create an intact DNA double helix. MMEJ almost always involves at least a small deletion, so that it is a mutagenic pathway. FEN1, the flap endonuclease in MMEJ, is epigenetically increased by promoter hypomethylation and is over-expressed in the majority of cancers of the breast, prostate, stomach, neuroblastomas, pancreas, and lung. PARP1 is also over-expressed when its promoter region ETS site is epigenetically hypomethylated, and this contributes to progression to endometrial cancer and BRCA-mutated serous ovarian cancer. Other genes in the MMEJ pathway are also over-expressed in a number of cancers (see MMEJ for summary), and are also shown in cyan.

=== Genome-wide distribution of DNA repair in human somatic cells ===
Differential activity of DNA repair pathways across various regions of the human genome causes mutations to be very unevenly distributed within tumor genomes. In particular, the gene-rich, early-replicating regions of the human genome exhibit lower mutation frequencies than the gene-poor, late-replicating heterochromatin. One mechanism underlying this involves the histone modification H3K36me3, which can recruit mismatch repair proteins, thereby lowering mutation rates in H3K36me3-marked regions. Another important mechanism concerns nucleotide excision repair, which can be recruited by the transcription machinery, lowering somatic mutation rates in active genes and other open chromatin regions.

== Epigenetic alterations due to DNA repair ==
Damage to DNA is very common and is constantly being repaired. Epigenetic alterations can accompany DNA repair of oxidative damage or double-strand breaks. In human cells, oxidative DNA damage occurs about 10,000 times a day and DNA double-strand breaks occur about 10 to 50 times a cell cycle in somatic replicating cells (see DNA damage (naturally occurring)). The selective advantage of DNA repair is to allow the cell to survive in the face of DNA damage. The selective advantage of epigenetic alterations that occur with DNA repair is not clear.

=== Repair of oxidative DNA damage can alter epigenetic markers ===
In the steady state (with endogenous damages occurring and being repaired), there are about 2,400 oxidatively damaged guanines that form 8-oxo-2'-deoxyguanosine (8-OHdG) in the average mammalian cell DNA. 8-OHdG constitutes about 5% of the oxidative damages commonly present in DNA. The oxidized guanines do not occur randomly among all guanines in DNA. There is a sequence preference for the guanine at a methylated CpG site (a cytosine followed by guanine along its 5' → 3' direction and where the cytosine is methylated (5-mCpG)). A 5-mCpG site has the lowest ionization potential for guanine oxidation.

Initiation of DNA demethylation at a CpG site. In adult somatic cells DNA methylation typically occurs in the context of CpG dinucleotides (CpG sites), forming 5-methylcytosine-pG, or 5mCpG. Reactive oxygen species (ROS) may attack guanine at the dinucleotide site, forming 8-hydroxy-2'-deoxyguanosine (8-OHdG), and resulting in a 5mCp-8-OHdG dinucleotide site. The base excision repair enzyme OGG1 targets 8-OHdG and binds to the lesion without immediate excision. OGG1, present at a 5mCp-8-OHdG site recruits TET1 and TET1 oxidizes the 5mC adjacent to the 8-OHdG. This initiates demethylation of 5mC.

Oxidized guanine has mispairing potential and is mutagenic. Oxoguanine glycosylase (OGG1) is the primary enzyme responsible for the excision of the oxidized guanine during DNA repair. OGG1 finds and binds to an 8-OHdG within a few seconds. However, OGG1 does not immediately excise 8-OHdG. In HeLa cells half maximum removal of 8-OHdG occurs in 30 minutes, and in irradiated mice, the 8-OHdGs induced in the mouse liver are removed with a half-life of 11 minutes.

When OGG1 is present at an oxidized guanine within a methylated CpG site it recruits TET1 to the 8-OHdG lesion (see Figure). This allows TET1 to demethylate an adjacent methylated cytosine. Demethylation of cytosine is an epigenetic alteration.

As an example, when human mammary epithelial cells were treated with H_{2}O_{2} for six hours, 8-OHdG increased about 3.5-fold in DNA and this caused about 80% demethylation of the 5-methylcytosines in the genome. Demethylation of CpGs in a gene promoter by TET enzyme activity increases transcription of the gene into messenger RNA. In cells treated with H_{2}O_{2}, one particular gene was examined, BACE1. The methylation level of the BACE1 CpG island was reduced (an epigenetic alteration) and this allowed about 6.5 fold increase of expression of BACE1 messenger RNA.

While six-hour incubation with H_{2}O_{2} causes considerable demethylation of 5-mCpG sites, shorter times of H_{2}O_{2} incubation appear to promote other epigenetic alterations. Treatment of cells with H_{2}O_{2} for 30 minutes causes the mismatch repair protein heterodimer MSH2-MSH6 to recruit DNA methyltransferase 1 (DNMT1) to sites of some kind of oxidative DNA damage. This could cause increased methylation of cytosines (epigenetic alterations) at these locations.

Jiang et al. treated HEK 293 cells with agents causing oxidative DNA damage, (potassium bromate (KBrO3) or potassium chromate (K2CrO4)). Base excision repair (BER) of oxidative damage occurred with the DNA repair enzyme DNA polymerase beta (Pol β) localizing to oxidized guanines. Pol β is the main human polymerase in short-patch BER of oxidative DNA damage. Jiang et al. also found that Pol β recruited the DNA methyltransferase protein DNMT3b to BER repair sites. They then evaluated the methylation pattern at the single nucleotide level in a small region of DNA including the promoter region and the early transcription region of the BRCA1 gene. Oxidative DNA damage from bromate modulated the DNA methylation pattern (caused epigenetic alterations) at CpG sites within the region of DNA studied. In untreated cells, CpGs located at −189, −134, −29, −19, +16, and +19 of the BRCA1 gene had methylated cytosines (where numbering is from the messenger RNA transcription start site, and negative numbers indicate nucleotides in the upstream promoter region). Bromate treatment-induced oxidation resulted in the loss of cytosine methylation at −189, −134, +16 and +19 while also leading to the formation of new methylation at the CpGs located at −80, −55, −21 and +8 after DNA repair was allowed.

=== Homologous recombinational repair alters epigenetic markers ===
At least four articles report the recruitment of DNA methyltransferase 1 (DNMT1) to sites of DNA double-strand breaks. During homologous recombinational repair (HR) of the double-strand break, the involvement of DNMT1 causes the two repaired strands of DNA to have different levels of methylated cytosines. One strand becomes frequently methylated at about 21 CpG sites downstream of the repaired double-strand break. The other DNA strand loses methylation at about six CpG sites that were previously methylated downstream of the double-strand break, as well as losing methylation at about five CpG sites that were previously methylated upstream of the double-strand break. When the chromosome is replicated, this gives rise to one daughter chromosome that is heavily methylated downstream of the previous break site and one that is unmethylated in the region both upstream and downstream of the previous break site. With respect to the gene that was broken by the double-strand break, half of the progeny cells express that gene at a high level and in the other half of the progeny cells expression of that gene is repressed. When clones of these cells were maintained for three years, the new methylation patterns were maintained over that time period.

In mice with a CRISPR-mediated homology-directed recombination insertion in their genome there were a large number of increased methylations of CpG sites within the double-strand break-associated insertion.

=== Non-homologous end joining ===
Work by Allen et al. showed that NHEJ of a DNA double-strand break in a cell could give rise to some progeny cells having repressed expression of the gene harboring the initial double-strand break and some progeny having high expression of that gene due to epigenetic alterations associated with NHEJ repair. The frequency of epigenetic alterations causing repression of a gene after an NHEJ repair of a DNA double-strand break in that gene may be about 0.9%.

== Evolution ==
The basic processes of DNA repair are highly conserved among both prokaryotes and eukaryotes and even among bacteriophages (viruses which infect bacteria); however, more complex organisms with more complex genomes have correspondingly more complex repair mechanisms. The ability of a large number of protein structural motifs to catalyze relevant chemical reactions has played a significant role in the elaboration of repair mechanisms during evolution. For an extremely detailed review of hypotheses relating to the evolution of DNA repair, see.

The fossil record indicates that single-cell life began to proliferate on the planet at some point during the Precambrian period, although exactly when recognizably modern life first emerged is unclear. Nucleic acids became the sole and universal means of encoding genetic information, requiring DNA repair mechanisms that in their basic form have been inherited by all extant life forms from their common ancestor. The emergence of Earth's oxygen-rich atmosphere (known as the "oxygen catastrophe") due to photosynthetic organisms, as well as the presence of potentially damaging free radicals in the cell due to oxidative phosphorylation, necessitated the evolution of DNA repair mechanisms that act specifically to counter the types of damage induced by oxidative stress. The mechanism by which this came about, however, is unclear.

=== Rate of evolutionary change ===
On some occasions, DNA damage is not repaired or is repaired by an error-prone mechanism that results in a change from the original sequence. When this occurs, mutations may propagate into the genomes of the cell's progeny. Should such an event occur in a germ line cell that will eventually produce a gamete, the mutation has the potential to be passed on to the organism's offspring. The rate of evolution in a particular species (or, in a particular gene) is a function of the rate of mutation. As a consequence, the rate and accuracy of DNA repair mechanisms have an influence over the process of evolutionary change. DNA damage protection and repair does not influence the rate of adaptation by gene regulation and by recombination and selection of alleles. On the other hand, DNA damage repair and protection does influence the rate of accumulation of irreparable, advantageous, code expanding, inheritable mutations, and slows down the evolutionary mechanism for expansion of the genome of organisms with new functionalities. The tension between evolvability and mutation repair and protection needs further investigation.

== Technology ==
A technology named clustered regularly interspaced short palindromic repeat (shortened to CRISPR-Cas9) was discovered in 2012. The new technology allows anyone with molecular biology training to alter the genes of any species with precision, by inducing DNA damage at a specific point and then altering DNA repair mechanisms to insert new genes. It is cheaper, more efficient, and more precise than other technologies. With the help of CRISPR–Cas9, parts of a genome can be edited by scientists by removing, adding, or altering parts in a DNA sequence.

== See also ==
- Accelerated aging disease
- Aging DNA
- Cell cycle
- DNA damage (naturally occurring)
- DNA damage theory of aging
- DNA replication
- Direct DNA damage
- Error detection and correction
- Gene therapy
- Human mitochondrial genetics
- Indirect DNA damage
- Life extension
- Progeria
- REPAIRtoire
- SiDNA
- The scientific journal DNA Repair under Mutation Research
