= ZNF598 =

Protein-coding gene in the species Homo sapiens

Identifiers
- Aliases: ZNF598, zinc finger protein 598, HEL2, zinc finger protein 598, E3 ubiquitin ligase
- External IDs: OMIM: 617508; MGI: 2670965; GeneCards: ZNF598
Enzyme activity
EC #	BRENDA	ExPASy	KEGG	MetaCyc
2.3.2.27	↗	↗	↗	↗

Gene location (Human)
Chr.	Chromosome 16 (human)
Band	16p13.3	Start	1,997,654 bp
Band	16p13.3	End	2,009,821 bp

Gene location (Mouse)
Chr.	Chromosome 17 (mouse)
Band	17|17 A3.3	Start	24,888,661 bp
Band	17|17 A3.3	End	24,900,990 bp
RNA expression pattern
Bgee	Human / Mouse (ortholog); Top expressed in: skin of leg; body of pancreas; skin of abdomen; sural nerve; minor salivary glands; granulocyte; anterior pituitary; right hemisphere of cerebellum; right lobe of liver; mucosa of transverse colon / Top expressed in: gallbladder; superior surface of tongue; lactiferous gland; zygote; crypt of lieberkuhn of small intestine; Ileal epithelium; choroid plexus of fourth ventricle; secondary oocyte; primary oocyte; lip; More reference expression data
BioGPS	n/a
Orthologs
Databases	NCBI: entry; OMA: entry
Species	Human	Mouse
Entrez	90850	213753
Ensembl	ENSG00000167962	ENSMUSG00000041130
UniProt	Q86UK7	Q80YR4
RefSeq (mRNA)	NM_178167; NM_001405664; NM_001405665	NM_183149; NM_001348231
RefSeq (protein)	NP_835461	NP_898972; NP_001335160
Location (UCSC)	Chr 16: 2 – 2.01 Mb	Chr 17: 24.89 – 24.9 Mb
PubMed search
- Wikidata
View/Edit Human	View/Edit Mouse

Zinc finger protein 598 (ZNF598) is a protein that in humans is encoded by the ZNF598 gene.

== Function ==
Zinc-finger proteins bind nucleic acids and play important roles in various cellular functions, including cell proliferation, differentiation, and apoptosis. This protein and Grb10-interacting GYF protein 2 have been identified as a components of the mammalian 4EHP (m4EHP) complex. The complex is thought to function as a translation repressor in embryonic development. ZNF598 and its yeast homologue Hel2 are ubiquitin ligases that ubiquitinate the 40S ribosomal subunit during ribosome-associated protein quality control.
