= Stephen Kowalczykowski =

American biologist and professor

Stephen C. Kowalczykowski
- Education: Rensselaer Polytechnic Institute, Georgetown University, University of Oregon
- Known for: DNA repair, homologous recombination, RecA, BRCA2, RecBCD, helicases, single-molecule biophysics
- Awards: American Academy of Arts and Sciences (2005); National Academy of Sciences (2007)
- Scientific career
- Fields: "Visual Biochemistry", Molecular Biology, Biophysics
- Workplaces: University of California, Davis
- Doctoral advisor: Jacinto Steinhardt, Peter von Hippel

Stephen Charles Kowalczykowski ("Steve K") is a Distinguished Professor of Microbiology and Molecular Genetics at the University of California, Davis. His research focuses on the biochemistry and molecular biology of DNA repair and homologous recombination. His lab combines fluorescence microscopy, optical trapping and microfluidics to manipulate and visualize single molecules of DNA and the enzymes involved in processing and repairing DNA. He calls this scientific approach, "visual biochemistry". Kowalczykowski was elected to the American Society for Arts and Science in 2005, the National Academy of Sciences in 2007 and was a Harvey Society Lecturer at Rockefeller University in 2012.

== Education and career ==
Kowalczykowski studied chemistry (B.S.) at Rensselaer Polytechnic Institute in 1972 and earned his Ph.D. in Chemistry/Biochemistry at Georgetown University in 1976. His dissertation title was "Physical-Chemistry studies of Sickle Cell Hemoglobin." He then worked as a postdoctoral researcher with Dr. Peter von Hippel at the University of Oregon Health Sciences Institute, where he began studying the physical chemistry of protein-nucleic interactions. He began his academic research career at Northwestern University Medical School in 1981 and later moved to the University of California, Davis in 1991. He is one of the world's foremost experts on RecA, the defining member of a ubiquitous class of DNA strand-exchange proteins that are essential for homologous recombination, a pathway that maintains genomic integrity by repairing broken DNA. His lab has made significant contributions to the fields of DNA repair, homologous recombination and the biophysics of DNA helicases.

== Scientific contributions ==
A few of his lab's notable scientific contributions include the structural and molecular mechanism of DNA end resection by RecBCD (E. coli) and DNA2-Sgs1-RPA and regulatory stimulation by Top3-Rmi1 and Mre11-Rad50-Xrs2 (S. cerevisiae), the kinetics of RecA filament nucleation and growth and regulation by RecFOR (E. coli), the purification and molecular mechanism of the human breast cancer susceptibility gene BRCA2 (humans), the mechanism of the Holliday junction dissolution by the Bloom's Syndrome helicase (BLM) homologue, Sgs1 (S. cerevisiae), and the mechanism of the 3-dimensional homology search catalyzed by RecA (E. coli).

== Publications ==
- Research publications on Pubmed.
