= RecF pathway =

DNA repair pathway

The RecF pathway, also called the RecFOR pathway, is a pathway of homologous recombination that repairs DNA in bacteria. It repairs breaks that occur on only one of DNA's two strands, known as single-strand gaps. The RecF pathway can also repair double-strand breaks in DNA when the RecBCD pathway, another pathway of homologous recombination in bacteria, is inactivated by mutations. Like the RecBCD pathway, the RecF pathway requires RecA for strand invasion. The two pathways are also similar in their phases of branch migration, in which the Holliday junction slides in one direction, and resolution, in which the Holliday junctions are cleaved apart by enzymes.

The RecF pathway begins when RecJ, an exonuclease that cleaves single-stranded DNA in the 5 → 3′ direction, binds to the 5' end of a single-strand gap in DNA and starts moving upstream while cleaving the 5' strand. Although RecJ can function without them, single-strand binding protein (SSBP) and the RecQ helicase greatly increase how much the 5' is cut back. When present, SSBP binds to the 3' overhang remaining after RecJ finishes cutting back the 5' strand. By binding to the single-stranded DNA, SSBP ensures that the 3' DNA overhang does not stick to itself through self-complementation.

The RecA protein can be loaded onto the SSBP-coated 3' overhang in one of two distinct pathways, one that requires the RecFOR enzyme or one that requires the RecOR enzyme. In the RecFOR pathway, the RecFR complex binds where the single-strand DNA of the 3' meets the double-strand DNA. RecO then displaces SSBP from the ssDNA, although SSBP remains attached to RecO. RecFOR then loads RecA onto a recessed 5' end of this ssDNA-dsDNA junction. The RecR subunit in RecFR then interacts with RecO to form the RecFOR complex. In doing so, the RecR subunit helps to both detach the SSBP molecules from RecO and load molecules of the RecA protein onto the 3' overhang.

The RecOR pathway of RecA loading differs from the RecFOR pathway in several respects, most notably its molecular interaction requirements and its ideal DNA substrate. Unlike the RecFOR pathway, the RecOR pathway requires an interaction between RecO and the C-terminus of SSBP. The RecOR pathway also does not need a ssDNA-dsDNA junction to begin loading RecA onto the 3' overhang, whereas the RecFOR pathway typically does to work efficiently. Thus, the RecOR pathway in most conditions is more efficient than the RecFOR pathway in loading RecA.
