= RECC =

RECC may refer to:

- RecBCD, a bacterial enzyme complex
- Reva Electric Car Company, one of the first companies to introduce electric vehicles worldwide
