= Recombination hotspot =

Genome region with relatively high rate of recombination

Recombination hotspots are regions in a genome that exhibit elevated rates of recombination relative to a neutral expectation. The recombination rate within hotspots can be hundreds of times that of the surrounding region. Recombination hotspots result from higher DNA break formation in these regions, and apply to both mitotic and meiotic cells. This appellation can refer to recombination events resulting from the uneven distribution of programmed meiotic double-strand breaks.

== Meiotic recombination ==
Meiotic recombination through crossing over is thought to be a mechanism by which a cell promotes correct segregation of homologous chromosomes and the repair of DNA damages. Crossing over requires a DNA double-stranded break followed by strand invasion of the homolog and subsequent repair. Initiation sites for recombination are usually identified by mapping crossing over events through pedigree analysis or through analysis of linkage disequilibrium. Linkage disequilibrium has identified more than 30,000 hotspots within the human genome. In humans, the average number of crossover recombination events per hotspot is one crossover per 1,300 meioses, and the most extreme hotspot has a crossover frequency of one per 110 meioses.

== Genomic rearrangements ==
Recombination can also occur due to errors in DNA replication that lead to genomic rearrangements. These events are often associated with pathology. However, genomic rearrangement is also thought to be a driving force in evolutionary development as it gives rise to novel gene combinations. Recombination hotspots may arise from the interaction of the following selective forces: the benefit of driving genetic diversity through genomic rearrangement coupled with selection acting to maintain favorable gene combinations.

== Initiation sites ==
DNA contains "fragile sites" within the sequence that are more prone to recombination. These fragile sites are associated with the following trinucleotide repeats: CGG-CCG, GAG-CTG, GAA-TTC, and GCN-NGC. These fragile sites are conserved in mammals and in yeast, suggesting that the instability is caused by something inherent to the molecular structure of DNA and is associated with DNA-repeat instability. These fragile sites are thought to form hairpin structures on the lagging strand during replication from single-stranded DNA base-pairing with itself in the trinucleotide repeat region. These hairpin structures cause DNA breaks that lead to a higher frequency of recombination at these sites.

Recombination hotspots are also thought to arise due to higher-order chromosome structure that make some areas of the chromosome more accessible to recombination than others. A double stranded-break initiation site was identified in mice and yeast, located at a common chromatin feature: the trimethylation of lysine 4 of histone H3 (H3K4me3).

Recombination hotspots do not seem to be solely caused by DNA sequence arrangements or chromosome structure. Alternatively, initiation sites of recombination hotspots can be coded for in the genome. Through the comparison of recombination between different mouse strains, locus Dsbc1 was identified as a locus that contributes to the specification of initiation sites in the genome in at least two recombination hotspot locations. Additional crossing over mapping located the Dsbc1 locus to the 12.2 to 16.7-Mb region of mouse chromosome 17, which contains the PRDM9 gene. The PRDM9 gene encodes a histone methyltransferase in the Dsbc1 region, providing evidence of a non-random, genetic basis for recombination initiation sites in mice. Rapid evolution of the PRDM9 gene explains the observation that human and chimpanzees share few recombination hotspots, despite a high level of sequence identity.

== Transcription associated recombination ==
Homologous recombination in functional regions of DNA is strongly stimulated by transcription, as observed in a range of different organisms. Transcription associated recombination appears to be due, at least in part, to the ability of transcription to open the DNA structure and enhance accessibility of DNA to exogenous chemicals and internal metabolites that cause recombinogenic DNA damages. These findings suggest that transcription-associated recombination may contribute significantly to recombination hotspot formation.

== Viral recombination hotspots ==
Homologous recombination is very frequent in RNA viruses. Recombination frequently occurs among very similar viruses, where crossover sites may occur anywhere across the genome, but after selection pressure these sites tend to localize in certain regions/hotspots. For example, in Enteroviruses, recombination hotspots have been identified at the 5'UTR-capsid region junction, and at the beginning of the P2 region. These two hotspots flank the P1 region that encodes for the capsid. In coronaviruses, the Spike genomic region is a recombination hotspot.

== See also ==
- Chi site
- Evolution
- Genetic recombination
