= RadA =

DNA repair and recombination protein

Identifiers
- Organism: Saccharolobus solfataricus (strain ATCC 35092)
- Symbol: radA
- Entrez: 72912053
- HomoloGene: 2155
- PDB: 2Z43
- RefSeq (Prot): WP_009990512.1
- UniProt: Q55075

Other data
- Chromosome: Genomic: 2.41 - 2.41 Mb
Search for
- Structures: Swiss-model
- Domains: InterPro

The DNA repair and recombination protein RadA is an archaeal homolog of the bacterial RecA protein and the eukaryotic Rad51 protein, playing a crucial role in homologous recombination and the maintenance of genomic stability by facilitating the repair of DNA double-strand breaks.
