= Chi site =

A Chi site or Chi sequence is a short stretch of DNA in the genome of a bacterium near which homologous recombination is more likely to occur than on average across the genome. Chi sites serve as stimulators of DNA double-strand break repair in bacteria, which can arise from radiation or chemical treatments, or result from replication fork breakage during DNA replication. The sequence of the Chi site is unique to each group of closely related organisms; in E. coli and other enteric bacteria, such as Salmonella, the core sequence is 5'-GCTGGTGG-3' plus important nucleotides about 4 to 7 nucleotides to the 3' side of the core sequence. The existence of Chi sites was originally discovered in the genome of bacteriophage lambda, a virus that infects E. coli, but is now known to occur about 1000 times in the E. coli genome.

The Chi sequence serves as a signal to the RecBCD helicase-nuclease that triggers a major change in the activities of this enzyme. Upon encountering the Chi sequence as it unwinds DNA, RecBCD cuts the DNA a few nucleotides to the 3’ side of Chi, within the important sequences noted above; depending on the reaction conditions, this cut is either a simple nick on the 3'-ended strand or the change of nuclease activity from cutting the 3’-ended strand to cutting the 5’-ended strand. In either case the resulting 3’ single-stranded DNA (ssDNA) is bound by multiple molecules of RecA protein that facilitate "strand invasion," in which one strand of a homologous double-stranded DNA is displaced by the RecA-associated ssDNA. Strand invasion forms a joint DNA molecule called a D-loop. Resolution of the D-loop is thought to occur by replication primed by the 3’ end generated at Chi (in the D-loop). Alternatively, the D-loop may be converted into a Holliday junction by cutting of the D-loop and a second exchange of DNA strands; the Holliday junction can be converted into linear duplex DNA by cutting of the Holliday junction and ligation of the resultant nicks. Either type of resolution can generate recombinant DNA molecules if the two interacting DNAs are genetically different, as well as repair the initially broken DNA.

Chi sites are sometimes referred to as "recombination hot spots". The name "Chi" is an abbreviation of crossover hotspot instigator. In reference to E. coli phage lambda, the term is sometimes written as "χ site", using the Greek letter chi; for E. coli and other bacteria the term "Chi" is proper.

== Genomic distribution ==
In E. coli K-12 MG1655, Chi sites are non-randomly distributed, with about 98% occurring in coding regions and about 75% oriented in the direction of replication. A comparative analysis of four bacterial genomes found that Chi sequences are frequent, regularly distributed, and overrepresented in each genome examined, but that other distribution features are not conserved across hosts.
