= PRDM9 =

Protein-coding gene in humans

Identifiers
- Aliases: PRDM9, MEISETZ, MSBP3, PFM6, PRMD9, ZNF899, PR domain 9, PR/SET domain 9, KMT8B
- External IDs: OMIM: 609760; MGI: 2384854; GeneCards: PRDM9
Available structures
PDB	Ortholog search: PDBe RCSB
PDB	List of PDB id codes 4IJD, 5EGB, 5EH2, 5EI9
Enzyme activity
EC #	BRENDA	ExPASy	KEGG	MetaCyc
2.1.1.354	↗	↗	↗	↗
2.1.1.355	↗	↗	↗	↗
2.1.1.359	↗	↗	↗	↗
2.1.1.361	↗	↗	↗	↗
2.1.1.362	↗	↗	↗	↗

Gene location (Human)
Chr.	Chromosome 5 (human)
Band	5p14.2	Start	23,443,586 bp
Band	5p14.2	End	23,528,093 bp

Gene location (Mouse)
Chr.	Chromosome 17 (mouse)
Band	17|17 A2	Start	15,543,079 bp
Band	17|17 A2	End	15,564,354 bp
RNA expression pattern
Bgee	Human / Mouse (ortholog); Top expressed in: testicle; gonad; right testis; left testis; sural nerve; corpus callosum; mononuclear cell; monocyte; granulocyte; bone / Top expressed in: neural layer of retina; granulocyte; muscle of thigh; zygote; lip; tail of embryo; spermatid; right kidney; morula; embryo; More reference expression data
BioGPS	n/a
Gene ontology
Molecular function	methyltransferase activity; transferase activity; metal ion binding; nucleic acid binding; DNA-binding transcription factor activity, RNA polymerase II-specific; recombination hotspot binding; histone-lysine N-methyltransferase activity; sequence-specific DNA binding; RNA polymerase II transcription regulatory region sequence-specific DNA binding; chromatin DNA binding; histone methyltransferase activity (H3-K4 specific); DNA-binding transcription factor activity
Cellular component	nucleoplasm; intracellular anatomical structure; nucleus; chromosome
Biological process	meiotic gene conversion; positive regulation of reciprocal meiotic recombination; histone lysine methylation; methylation; regulation of transcription, DNA-templated; meiosis; transcription, DNA-templated; chromatin organization; regulation of transcription by RNA polymerase II; histone H3-K4 methylation
Sources:Amigo / QuickGO
Orthologs
Databases	NCBI: entry; OMA: entry
Species	Human	Mouse
Entrez	56979	213389
Ensembl	ENSG00000164256	ENSMUSG00000051977
UniProt	Q9NQV7	E9Q4V2
RefSeq (mRNA)	NM_020227; NM_001310214; NM_001376900	NM_144809; NM_001361436
RefSeq (protein)	NP_001297143; NP_064612; NP_001363829	NP_659058; NP_001348365
Location (UCSC)	Chr 5: 23.44 – 23.53 Mb	Chr 17: 15.54 – 15.56 Mb
PubMed search
- Wikidata
View/Edit Human	View/Edit Mouse

PR domain (Note: positive-regulatory domain) zinc finger protein 9 is a protein that in humans is encoded by the PRDM9 gene. PRDM9 is responsible for positioning recombination hotspots during meiosis by binding a DNA sequence motif encoded in its zinc finger domain. PRDM9 is the only speciation gene found so far in mammals, and is one of the fastest evolving genes in the genome.

== Gene and evolution ==
=== Rapid evolution of target sequences ===
A PRDM9 protein targets a specific DNA sequence using its Zinc fingers. This target sequence evolves very quickly: it is estimated that 1% of human target sequences within recombination hotspots have accumulated mutations less than 30,000 generations. Furthermore, there is documented hypervariation in the PRDM9 target sequence both within and between species. It has been identified as a speciation gene in mice.

=== The red queen hypothesis ===
It has been suggested that the rapid erosion of PRDM9 target sites is due to biased gene conversion: since PRDM9 causes a double-strand break at its target site, this site tends to be repaired using the homologous chromosome, and if the organism considered is heterozygous at this site, then the non-target allele will serve as template to repair the double-strand break at the target allele.

This led to the red queen hypothesis of PRDM9 evolution (a reference to the Red Queen). The model is as follows: consider a given PRDM9 allele A with target sequence X. As time goes by, the X sequence tends to disappear due to biased gene conversion. It then becomes harder and harder for organisms with the A allele to perform meiosis, since their PRDM9 proteins cannot find find targets. This in turn favors the emergence of a new PRDM9 allele B which targets a new sequence Y.

=== Selection ===
The precise evolutionary reasons for the maintenance of PRDM9 (why evolution picks a new PRDM9 allele instead of deleting it), and more generally of recombination hotspots, has been much debated. Whereas the adaptive function of such a hotspot in reducing negative linkage disequilibrium or pulling crossing-overs away from promoter regions is mostly unsupported, recent papers insists on the importance of PRDM9 in facilitating homologous repairs after a double strand break as being the main cause for its positive selection.

== Structure ==
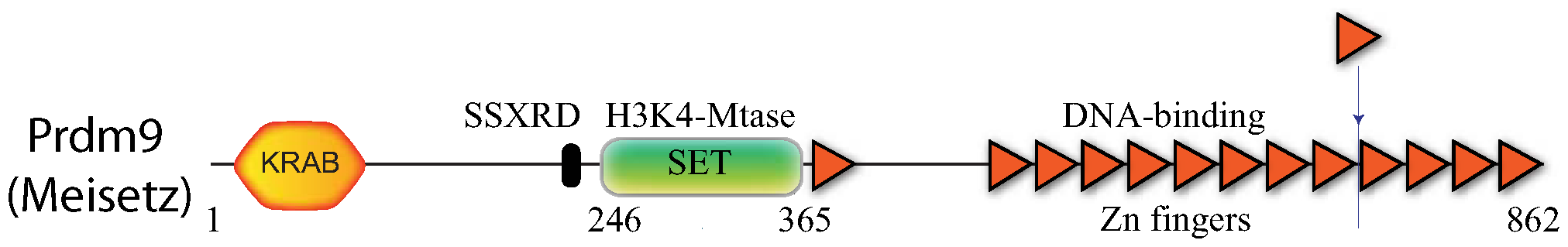
Schematic of the PRDM9 Domain Architecture in mice

PRDM9 has multiple domains, including a KRAB domain, SSXRD, PR/SET domain (H3K4 & H3K36 trimethyltransferase), and an array of C2H2 zinc finger domains (DNA binding).

== Function ==
=== Formation of double-strand breaks ===
The PRDM9 zinc finger array recognizes a specific target. Upon binding to DNA, PRDM9 catalyzes trimethylation of histone H3 at lysine 4 and lysine 36. As a result, local nucleosomes are reorganized and through an unknown mechanism the recombination machinery is recruited to form double strand breaks.

=== Symmetric repair of double-strand breaks ===
It has been shown that when a double-strand break occurs at a PRDM9 target site, symmetric repair using the homologous chromosome is greatly facilitated when the latter also harbors a PRDM9 protein fixed to the homologous site.

=== Recombination hotspots ===
PRDM9 mediates the process of meiosis by directing the sites of homologous recombination in most animals, but has been lost in dogs and birds. In humans and mice, recombination does not occur evenly throughout the genome, but at particular sites along the chromosomes called recombination hotspots. Hotspots are regions of DNA about 1–2kb in length. There are approximately 30,000 to 50,000 hotspots within the human genome corresponding to one for every 50–100kb DNA on average. In humans, the average number of crossover recombination events per hotspot is one per 1,300 meioses, and the most extreme hotspot has a crossover frequency of one per 110 meioses.

=== Specificity of hotspots ===
Unlike other recombination hotspots, PRDM9-determined hotspots can occur within heterochromatin. They also differ in that they usually don't occur in promoter regions. Furthermore, recombination hot spots at PRDM9-site are unaffected by sex, at least in mice.

== History ==
In 1974, Jiri Forejt and P. Ivanyi identified a locus which they named Hst1 which controlled hybrid sterility.

In 1982, a haplotype was identified controlling recombination rate wm7, which would later be identified as PRDM9.

In 1991, a protein binding to the minisatelite consensus sequence 5′-CCACCTGCCCACCTCT-3′ was detected and partially purified (named Msbp3 - minisatelite binding protein 3). This would later turn out to be the same PRDM9 protein independently identified later.

In 2005, a gene was identified (named Meisetz) that is required for progression through meiotic prophase and has H3K4 methyltransferase activity.

In 2009, Jiri Forejt and colleagues identified Hst1 as Meisetz/PRDM9—the first and so far only speciation gene discovered in mammals. Later in 2009, PRDM9 was identified as one of the fastest evolving genes in the genome.

In 2010, three groups independently identified PRDM9 as controlling the positioning of recombination hotspots in humans and mice.

In 2012, it was shown that almost all hotspots are positioned by PRDM9, and that, in its absence, hotspots form near promoters.

In 2014, it was reported that the PRDM9 SET domain could also trimethylate H3K36 in vitro, which was confirmed in vivo in 2016.

In 2016, it was shown that the hybrid sterility caused by PRDM9 can be reversed, and that the sterility is caused by asymmetric double strand breaks.
