= Statistical coupling analysis =

Method to identify covarying pairs of amino acids in proteins

Statistical Coupling Analysis (SCA) is a method used in bioinformatics to study how pairs of amino acids in a protein sequence evolve together. It analyzes a multiple sequence alignment (MSA), which is a display of the sequences of many related proteins arranged to highlight similarities and differences. SCA measures how much the amino acid makeup at one position in the protein changes when the amino acid makeup at another position is altered. This relationship is quantified as statistical coupling energy. A higher coupling energy indicates that the amino acids at both positions are more likely to have co-evolved and are therefore functionally or structurally linked. In simpler terms, it helps scientists understand which parts of a protein are working together and how they have changed over evolutionary time.

== Definition of statistical coupling energy ==
Statistical coupling energy measures how a perturbation of amino acid distribution at one site in an MSA affects the amino acid distribution at another site. For example, consider a multiple sequence alignment with sites (or columns) a through z, where each site has some distribution of amino acids. At position i, 60% of the sequences have a valine and the remaining 40% of sequences have a leucine, at position j the distribution is 40% isoleucine, 40% histidine and 20% methionine, k has an average distribution (the 20 amino acids are present at roughly the same frequencies seen in all proteins), and l has 80% histidine, 20% valine. Since positions i, j and l have an amino acid distribution different from the mean distribution observed in all proteins, they are said to have some degree of conservation.

In statistical coupling analysis, the conservation (ΔG^{stat}) at each site (i) is defined as: $\Delta G_i^{stat} = \sqrt{\sum_x (\ln P_i^x)^2}$.

Here, P_{i}^{x} describes the probability of finding amino acid x at position i, and is defined by a function in binomial form as follows:

$P_i^x = \frac{N!}{n_x!(N - n_x)!}p_x^{n_x}(1 - p_x)^{N - n_x}$,

where N is 100, n_{x} is the percentage of sequences with residue x (e.g. methionine) at position i, and p_{x} corresponds to the approximate distribution of amino acid x in all positions among all sequenced proteins. The summation runs over all 20 amino acids. After ΔG_{i}^{stat} is computed, the conservation for position i in a subalignment produced after a perturbation of amino acid distribution at j (ΔG_{i | δj}^{stat}) is taken. Statistical coupling energy, denoted ΔΔG_{i, j}^{stat}, is simply the difference between these two values. That is:

$\Delta\Delta G_{i, j}^{stat} = \Delta G_{i | \delta j}^{stat} - \Delta G_i^{stat}$, or, more commonly, $\Delta\Delta G_{i, j}^{stat} = \sqrt{\sum_x (\ln P_{i|\delta j}^x - \ln P_i^x)^2}$

Statistical coupling energy is often systematically calculated between a fixed, perturbated position, and all other positions in an MSA. Continuing with the example MSA from the beginning of the section, consider a perturbation at position j where the amino distribution changes from 40% I, 40% H, 20% M to 100% I. If, in a subsequent subalignment, this changes the distribution at i from 60% V, 40% L to 90% V, 10% L, but does not change the distribution at position l, then there would be some amount of statistical coupling energy between i and j but none between l and j.

== Applications ==
Ranganathan and Lockless originally developed SCA to examine thermodynamic (energetic) coupling of residue pairs in proteins. Using the PDZ domain family, they were able to identify a small network of residues that were energetically coupled to a binding site residue. The network consisted of both residues spatially close to the binding site in the tertiary fold, called contact pairs, and more distant residues that participate in longer-range energetic interactions. Later applications of SCA by the Ranganathan group on the GPCR, serine protease and hemoglobin families also showed energetic coupling in sparse networks of residues that cooperate in allosteric communication.

Statistical coupling analysis has also been used as a basis for computational protein design. In 2005, Socolich et al. used an SCA for the WW domain to create artificial proteins with similar thermodynamic stability and structure to natural WW domains. The fact that 12 out of the 43 designed proteins with the same SCA profile as natural WW domains properly folded provided strong evidence that little information—only coupling information—was required for specifying the protein fold. This support for the SCA hypothesis was made more compelling considering that a) the successfully folded proteins had only 36% average sequence identity to natural WW folds, and b) none of the artificial proteins designed without coupling information folded properly. An accompanying study showed that the artificial WW domains were functionally similar to natural WW domains in ligand binding affinity and specificity.

In de novo protein structure prediction, it has been shown that, when combined with a simple residue-residue distance metric, SCA-based scoring can fairly accurately distinguish native from non-native protein folds.

== See also ==
Mutual information
