= RecBCD =

Family of protein complexes in bacteria

Exodeoxyribonuclease V
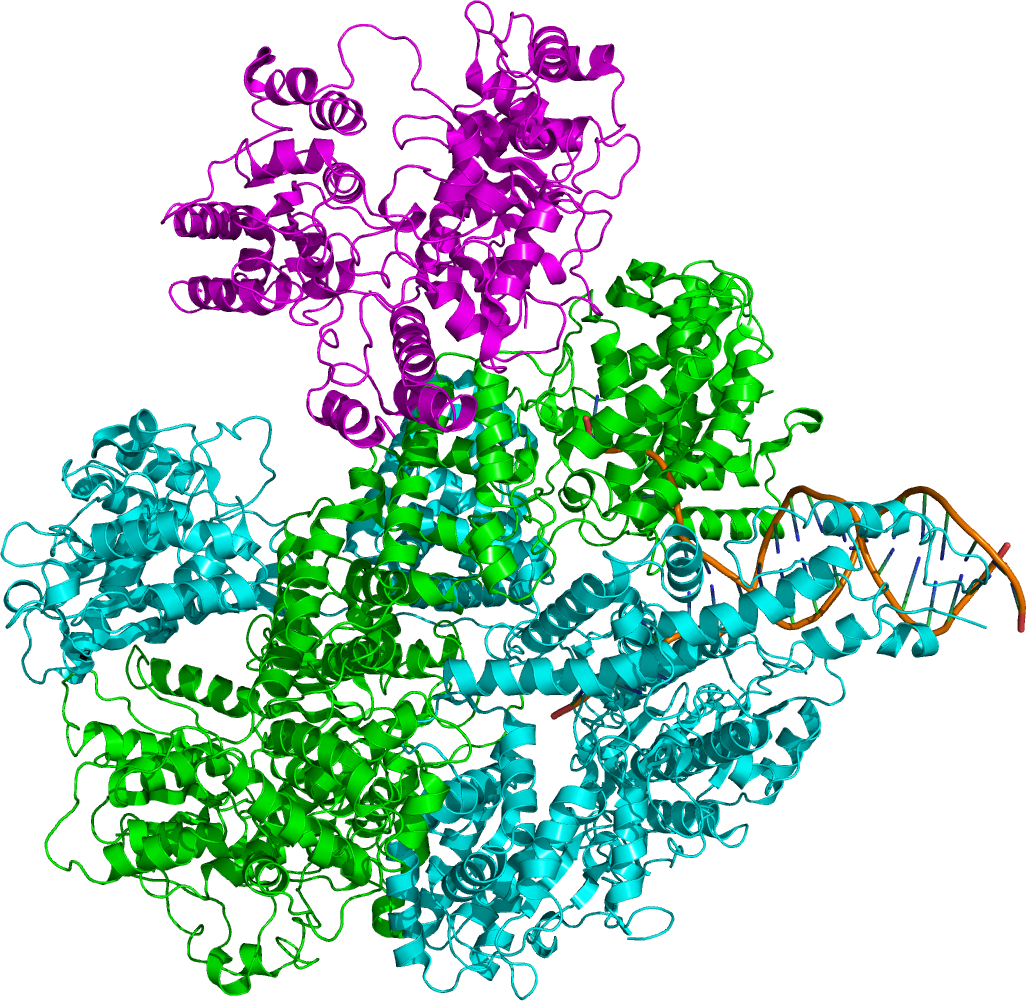
- Figure 1 The crystallographic structure of the RecBCD enzyme (PDB: 1W36). The RecB, RecC, and RecD subunits of the enzyme are colored cyan, green, and magenta respectively while the partially unwound DNA helix to which the enzyme is bound is colored brown.

Identifiers
- EC no.: 3.1.11.5
- CAS no.: 37350-26-8

Databases
- BRENDA: enzyme data
- ExPASy: NiceZyme view
- KEGG: enzyme entry
- MetaCyc: metabolic pathway
- Rhea: reactions
- PDB structures: RCSB PDB PDBe PDBsum
Search
- PMC: articles
- PubMed: articles
- NCBI: proteins

Exodeoxyribonuclease V (EC 3.1.11.5, RecBCD, Exonuclease V, Escherichia coli exonuclease V, E. coli exonuclease V, gene recBC endoenzyme, RecBC deoxyribonuclease, gene recBC DNase, gene recBCD enzymes) is an enzyme of E. coli that initiates recombinational repair from potentially lethal double strand breaks in DNA which may result from ionizing radiation, replication errors, endonucleases, oxidative damage, and a host of other factors. The RecBCD enzyme is both a helicase that unwinds, or separates the strands of DNA, and a nuclease that makes single-stranded nicks in DNA. It catalyses exonucleolytic cleavage (in the presence of ATP) in either 5′- to 3′- or 3′- to 5′-direction to yield 5′-phosphooligonucleotides.

== Structure ==
The enzyme complex is composed of three different subunits called RecB, RecC, and RecD and hence the complex is named RecBCD (Figure 1). Before the discovery of the recD gene, the enzyme was known as “RecBC.” Each subunit is encoded by a separate gene:

gene	chain	protein	function
RecB	β	P08394	3'-5' helicase, nuclease
RecC	γ	P07648	Recognizes Chi (crossover hotspot instigator)
RecD	α	P04993	5'-3' helicase

== Function ==
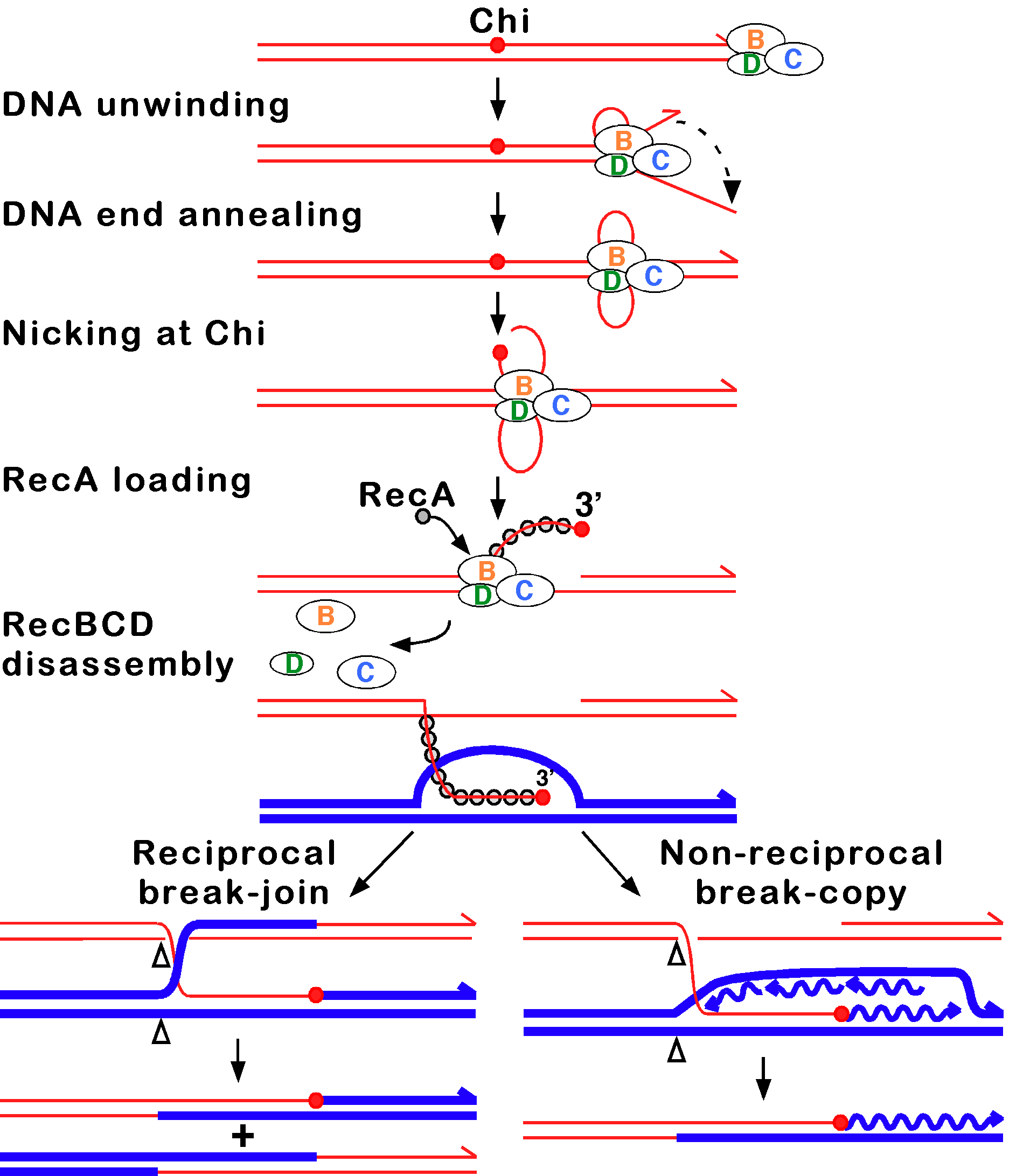
Figure 2 RecBCD pathway of homologous recombination where ATP is in excess.

Both the RecD and RecB subunits are helicases, i.e., energy-dependent molecular motors that unwind DNA (or RNA in the case of other proteins). The RecB subunit in addition has a nuclease function. Finally, RecBCD enzyme (perhaps the RecC subunit) recognizes a specific sequence in DNA, 5'-GCTGGTGG-3', known as Chi (sometimes designated with the Greek letter χ).

RecBCD is unusual amongst helicases because it has two helicases that travel with different rates and because it can recognize and be altered by the Chi DNA sequence. RecBCD avidly binds an end of linear double-stranded (ds) DNA. The RecD helicase travels on the strand with a 5' end at which the enzyme initiates unwinding, and RecB on the strand with a 3' end. RecB is slower than RecD, so that a single-stranded (ss) DNA loop accumulates ahead of RecB (Figure 2). This produces DNA structures with two ss tails (a shorter 3’ ended tail and a longer 5’ ended tail) and one ss loop (on the 3' ended strand) observed by electron microscopy. The ss tails can anneal to produce a second ss loop complementary to the first one; such twin-loop structures were initially referred to as “rabbit ears.”

== Mechanism of action ==
Figure 3 Beginning of the RecBCD pathway of homologous recombination where Mg^{2+} is in excess.

During unwinding the nuclease in RecB can act in different ways depending on the reaction conditions, notably the ratio of the concentrations of Mg^{2+} ions and ATP. (1) If ATP is in excess, the enzyme simply nicks the strand with Chi (the strand with the initial 3' end) (Figure 2). Unwinding continues and produces a 3' ss tail with Chi near its terminus. This tail can be bound by RecA protein, which promotes strand exchange with an intact homologous DNA duplex. When RecBCD reaches the end of the DNA, all three subunits disassemble and the enzyme remains inactive for an hour or more; a RecBCD molecule that acted at Chi does not attack another DNA molecule. (2) If Mg^{2+} ions are in excess, RecBCD cleaves both DNA strands endonucleolytically, although the 5' tail is cleaved less often (Figure 3). When RecBCD encounters a Chi site on the 3' ended strand, unwinding pauses and digestion of the 3' tail is reduced. When RecBCD resumes unwinding, it now cleaves the opposite strand (i.e., the 5' tail) and loads RecA protein onto the 3’-ended strand. After completing reaction on one DNA molecule, the enzyme quickly attacks a second DNA, on which the same reactions occur as on the first DNA.

Although neither reaction has been verified by analysis of intracellular DNA, due to the transient nature of reaction intermediates, genetic evidence indicates that the first reaction more nearly mimics that in cells. For example, the activity of Chi is influenced by nucleotides to its 3' side, both in cells and in reactions with ATP in excess but not with Mg^{2+} in excess [PMIDs 27401752, 27330137]. RecBCD mutants lacking detectable exonuclease activity retain high Chi hotspot activity in cells and nicking at Chi outside cells. A Chi site on one DNA molecule in cells reduces or eliminates Chi activity on another DNA, perhaps reflecting the Chi-dependent disassembly of RecBCD observed in vitro under conditions of excess ATP and nicking of DNA at Chi.

Under both reaction conditions, the 3' strand remains intact downstream of Chi. The RecA protein is then actively loaded onto the 3' tail by RecBCD. At some undetermined point RecBCD dissociates from the DNA, although RecBCD can unwind at least 60 kb of DNA without falling off. RecA initiates exchange of the DNA strand to which it is bound with the identical, or nearly identical, strand in an intact DNA duplex; this strand exchange generates a joint DNA molecule, such as a D-loop (Figure 2). The joint DNA molecule is thought to be resolved either by replication primed by the invading 3’ ended strand containing Chi or by cleavage of the D-loop and formation of a Holliday junction. The Holliday junction can be resolved into linear DNA by the RuvABC complex or dissociated by the RecG protein. Each of these events can generate intact DNA with new combinations of genetic markers by which the parental DNAs may differ. This process, homologous recombination, completes the repair of the double-stranded DNA break.

== RecD1 and RecD2 ==
RecD enzymes are divided into two groups RecD1 (known as RecD) and RecD2. Many organisms have a recD gene even though the other members of a recBCD complex, i. e. rec B and recC, are not present. For instance, the bacterium Deinococcus radiodurans, that has an extraordinary DNA repair capability, is an example of an organism that does not possess a recB or recC gene, and yet does have a recD gene. In the bacterium Escherichia coli, RecD protein is part of the well studied RecBCD complex that is necessary for recombinational DNA repair (as described above). In the bacterium Bacillus subtilis, RecD2 protein has a role as a modulator of replication restart and also a modulator of the RecA recombinase. RecD2 may inhibit unwanted recombination events when replication forks are stalled, and also may have a role in displacing RecA protein from recombination intermediates in order to permit advance of the replication fork.

== Applications ==
RecBCD is a model enzyme for the use of single molecule fluorescence as an experimental technique used to better understand the function of protein-DNA interactions. The enzyme is also useful in removing linear DNA, either single- or double-stranded, from preparations of circular double-stranded DNA, since it requires a DNA end for activity.
