= RecA =

DNA repair protein

recA bacterial DNA recombination protein
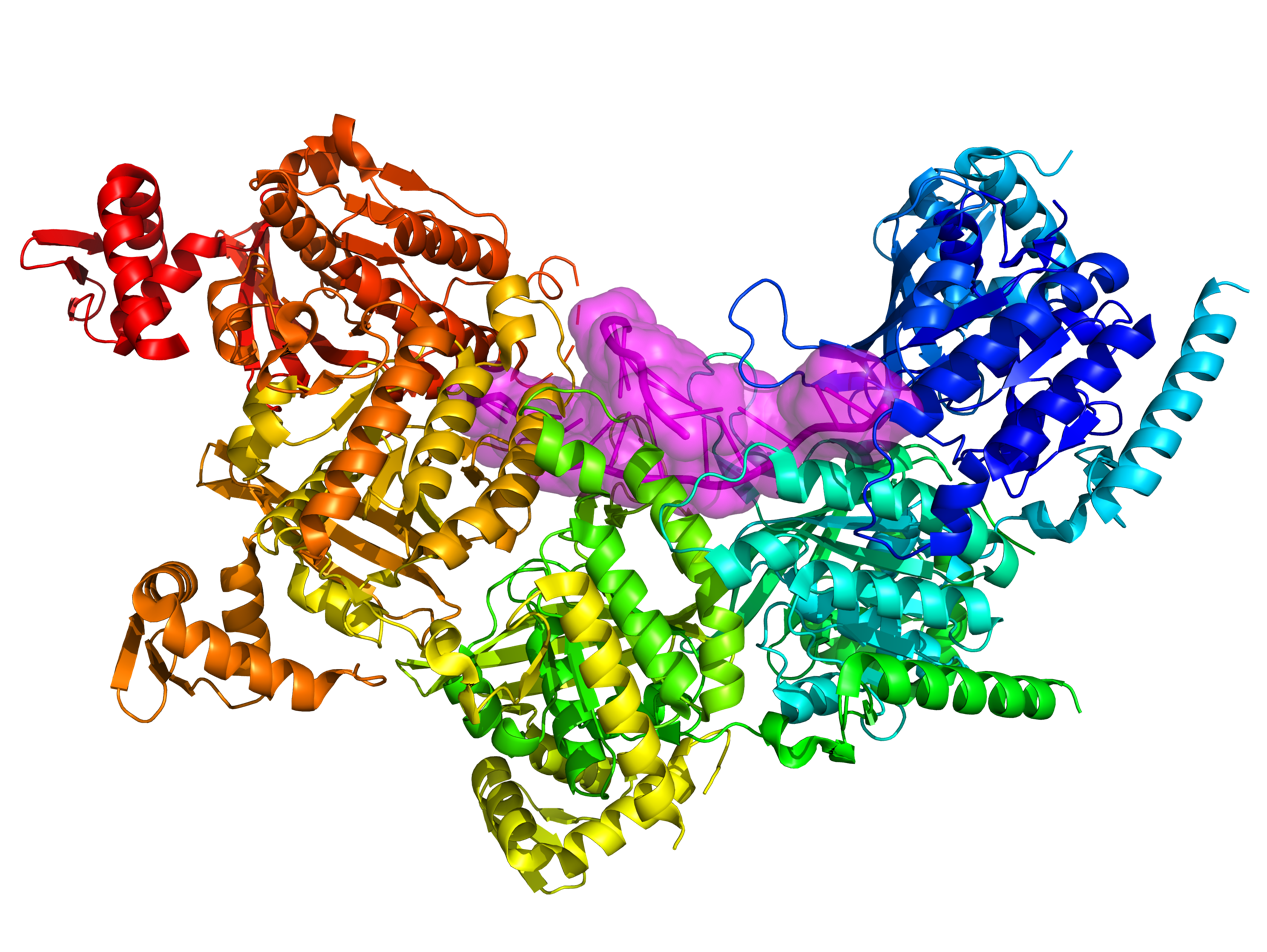
- Crystal structure of a RecA (rainbow colored)-DNA (magenta) complex. PDB ID: 3cmt.

Identifiers
- Symbol: RecA
- Pfam: PF00154
- Pfam clan: CL0023
- InterPro: IPR013765
- PROSITE: PDOC00131
- SCOP2: 2reb / SCOPe / SUPFAM
Available protein structures:
- PDB: IPR013765 PF00154 (ECOD; PDBsum)
- AlphaFold: IPR013765; PF00154

DNA recombination/repair protein RecA

Identifiers
- Organism: Escherichia coli
- Symbol: recA
- Entrez: 947170
- Orthologs: NCBI: entry; OMA: entry
- PDB: 3CMT
- RefSeq (Prot): NP_417179.1
- UniProt: P0A7G6

Other data
- EC number: 3.6.4.12
- Chromosome: Genomic: 2.82 - 2.82 Mb
Search for
- Structures: Swiss-model
- Domains: InterPro

RecA is a 38 kilodalton protein essential for the repair and maintenance of DNA in bacteria. It functions as a recombinase and strand-exchange protein, catalyzing the central steps of homologous recombination by forming nucleoprotein filaments on single-stranded DNA. Structural and functional homologs to RecA have been found in all kingdoms of life. RecA serves as an archetype for this class of homologous DNA repair proteins. The homologous protein is called RAD51 in eukaryotes and RadA in archaea.

RecA has multiple activities, all related to DNA repair. As a recombinase, it mediates ATP-dependent strand exchange between homologous DNA molecules, driving the key pairing and heteroduplex formation steps of recombinational repair. In the bacterial SOS response, it functions as a co-protease in the autocatalytic cleavage of the LexA repressor and the λ repressor.

== Structure ==
The E. coli RecA monomer (352 amino acids, ~37.8 kDa) is organized into three structural domains:

- small N-terminal domain (NTD, residues ~1–33) The NTD mediates monomer–monomer interactions during filament polymerization and additionally facilitates presynaptic filament formation and dsDNA capture, functions that are evolutionarily conserved across the RecA/RAD51/RadA family.
- central core ATPase domain (CAD, residues ~34–240) The CAD constitutes the functional heart of the protein, housing two Walker motifs (Walker A (P-loop) and Walker B) responsible for ATP binding and hydrolysis, as well as the DNA-binding loops L1 and L2 that contact single-stranded DNA within the filament.
- large C-terminal domain (CTD, residues ~241–352). The CTD contributes to secondary DNA binding (the interaction with the incoming duplex during homology search) and contains a second nucleotide-binding site implicated in allosteric regulation of filament activity.

RecA monomers polymerize cooperatively onto ssDNA in the presence of ATP to form a right-handed helical nucleoprotein filament with approximately 6 monomers per turn and a helical pitch of ~95 Å, in which the DNA is stretched ~1.5-fold relative to B-form and held in a conformation competent for homology search and strand exchange. The filament exists in two conformational states — an extended, ATP-bound active form and a compressed, ADP-bound inactive form — with cooperative transitions between neighboring monomers ensuring that the filament remains catalytically competent throughout the ATPase cycle.

== Function ==
=== Homologous recombination ===
The RecA protein binds strongly and in long clusters to ssDNA to form a nucleoprotein filament. This is also called a presynaptic filament. The presynaptic filament has an inactive and active conformation. RecA must be bound to ATP to form an active filament. The activated filament searches for a homologous region of dsDNA to bind to, a process known as synapsis.

The mechanisms of the RecA homology search are not fully understood. The RecA filament searches the dsDNA in 8 base pair segments. When the threshold of 8-bases of homology is exceeded, the filament complex is stabilized. In 2021, Witkor et al., demonstrated that the RecA filament uses a "reduced dimensionality" search mechanism.

Once the filament has located and bound to a complementary sequence of dsDNA, strand exchange occurs. This reaction occurs in the 5' to 3' direction.

Since it is a DNA-dependent ATPase, RecA contains an additional site for binding and hydrolyzing ATP. RecA associates more tightly with DNA when it has ATP bound than when it has ADP bound.

Homologous recombination events mediated by RecA can occur in Escherichia coli during the period after DNA replication when sister loci remain close. RecA can also mediate homology pairing, homologous recombination, and DNA break repair between distant sister loci that had segregated to opposite halves of the E. coli cell.

=== Natural transformation ===
Natural bacterial transformation involves the transfer of DNA from one bacterium to another (ordinarily of the same species) and the integration of the donor DNA into the recipient chromosome by homologous recombination, a process mediated by the RecA protein. In some bacteria, the recA gene is induced in response to the bacterium becoming competent, the physiological state required for transformation.

== Clinical significance ==
RecA has been proposed as a potential drug target for bacterial infections. Small molecules that interfere with RecA function have been identified. Since many antibiotics lead to DNA damage, and all bacteria rely on RecA to fix this damage, inhibitors of RecA could be used to enhance the toxicity of antibiotics. Inhibitors of RecA may also delay or prevent the appearance of bacterial drug resistance.

== History ==
RecA was discovered in 1965 by Alvin J. Clark and Ann Dee Margulies in genetic screens for recombination deficient strains of E. coli. The gene name "rec", first published in 1969, was chosen to indicate its involvement in recombination. In 1976, the recA gene was cloned for the first time by Kevin McEntee. Shortly after, the protein was purified for the first time by several groups. Purification of the protein led to a number of breakthroughs on the biochemical properties of RecA. The first crystal structure of RecA was published in 1992, nearly 30 years after the protein was discovered.

Later research identified related proteins, including RecBCD and RecF.
