= Cancer epigenetics =

Field of study in cancer research

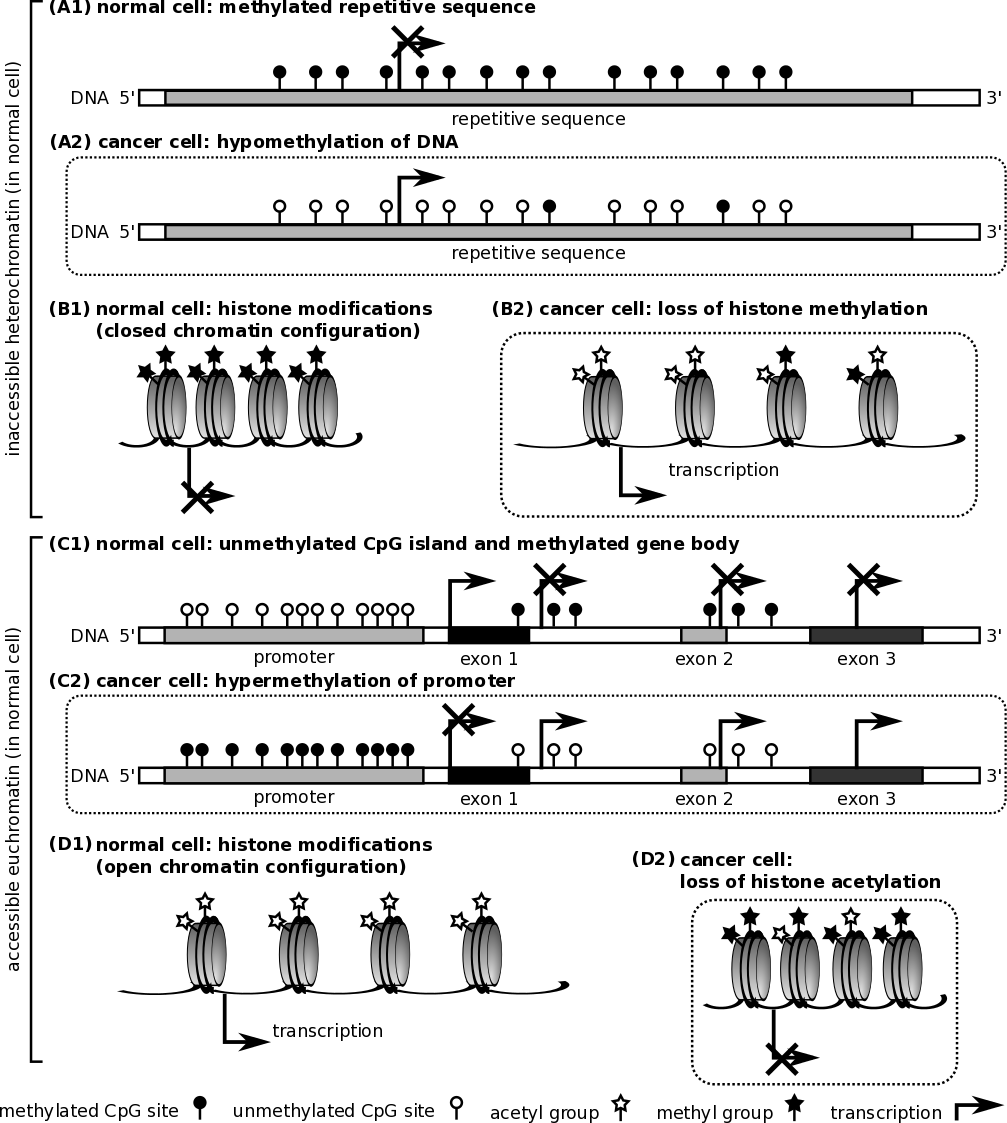
Epigenetics patterns in a normal and cancer cells

Epigenetic alterations in tumour progression

Cancer epigenetics is the study of epigenetic modifications to the DNA of cancer cells that do not involve a change in the nucleotide sequence, but instead involve a change in the way the genetic code is expressed. Epigenetic mechanisms are necessary to maintain normal sequences of tissue specific gene expression and are crucial for normal development. They may be just as important, if not even more important, than genetic mutations in a cell's transformation to cancer. The disturbance of epigenetic processes in cancers, can lead to a loss of expression of genes that occurs about 10 times more frequently by transcription silencing (caused by epigenetic promoter hypermethylation of CpG islands) than by mutations. As Vogelstein et al. points out, in a colorectal cancer there are usually about 3 to 6 driver mutations and 33 to 66 hitchhiker or passenger mutations. However, in colon tumors compared to adjacent normal-appearing colonic mucosa, there are about 600 to 800 heavily methylated CpG islands in the promoters of genes in the tumors while these CpG islands are not methylated in the adjacent mucosa. Manipulation of epigenetic alterations holds great promise for cancer prevention, detection, and therapy. In different types of cancer, a variety of epigenetic mechanisms can be perturbed, such as the silencing of tumor suppressor genes and activation of oncogenes by altered CpG island methylation patterns, histone modifications, and dysregulation of DNA binding proteins. There are several medications which have epigenetic impact, that are now used in a number of these diseases.

== Mechanisms ==
=== DNA methylation ===
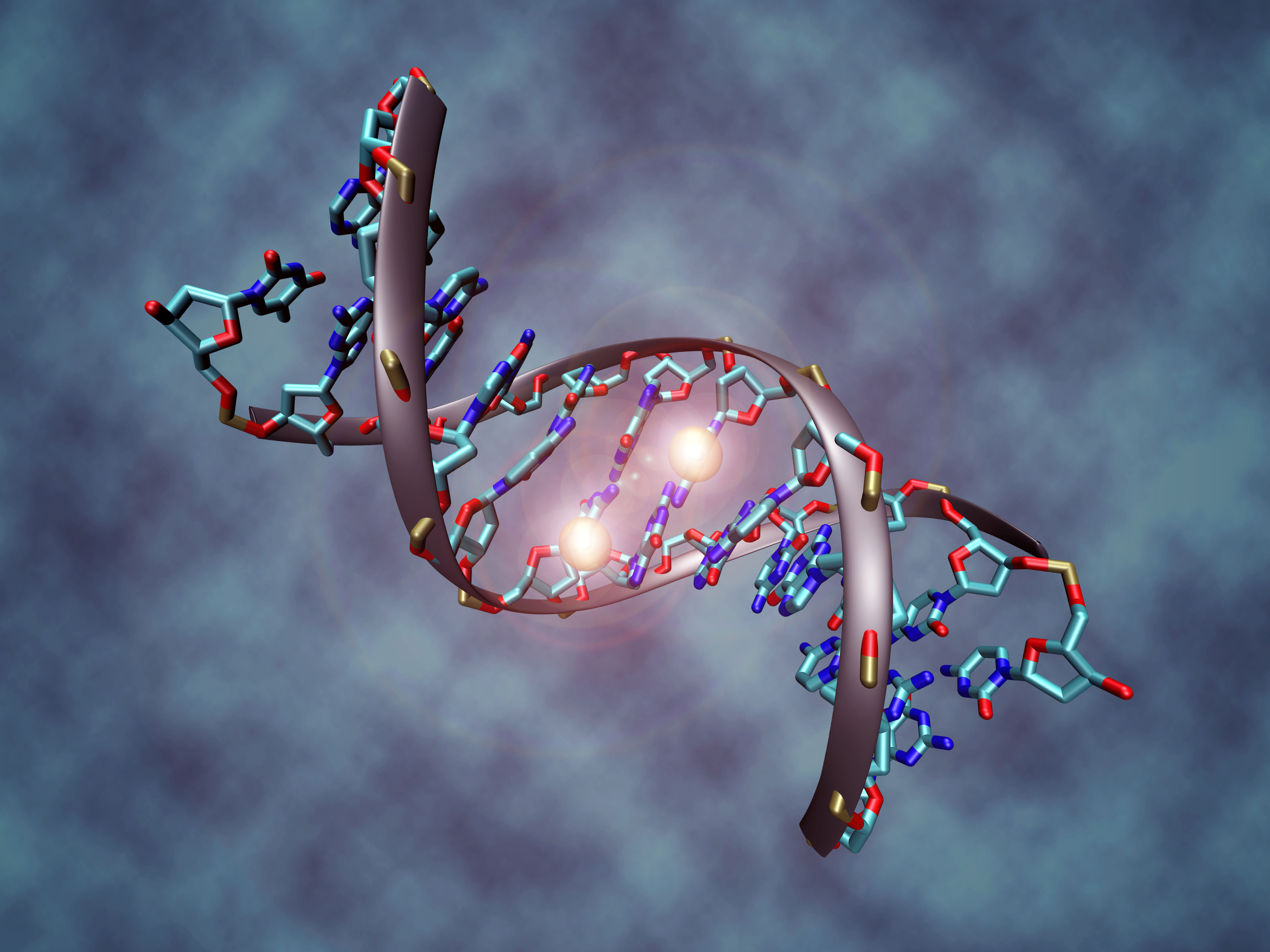
A DNA molecule fragment that is methylated at two cytosines

In somatic cells, patterns of DNA methylation are in general transmitted to daughter cells with high fidelity. Typically, this methylation only occurs at cytosines that are located 5' to guanosine in the CpG dinucleotides of higher order eukaryotes. However, epigenetic DNA methylation differs between normal cells and tumor cells in humans. The "normal" CpG methylation profile is often inverted in cells that become tumorigenic. In normal cells, CpG islands preceding gene promoters are generally unmethylated, and tend to be transcriptionally active, while other individual CpG dinucleotides throughout the genome tend to be methylated. However, in cancer cells, CpG islands preceding tumor suppressor gene promoters are often hypermethylated, while CpG methylation of oncogene promoter regions and parasitic repeat sequences is often decreased.

Hypermethylation of tumor suppressor gene promoter regions can result in silencing of those genes. This type of epigenetic mutation allows cells to grow and reproduce uncontrollably, leading to tumorigenesis. The addition of methyl groups to cytosines causes the DNA to coil tightly around the histone proteins, resulting in DNA that can not undergo transcription (transcriptionally silenced DNA). Genes commonly found to be transcriptionally silenced due to promoter hypermethylation include: Cyclin-dependent kinase inhibitor p16, a cell-cycle inhibitor; MGMT, a DNA repair gene; APC, a cell cycle regulator; MLH1, a DNA-repair gene; and BRCA1, another DNA-repair gene. Indeed, cancer cells can become addicted to the transcriptional silencing, due to promoter hypermethylation, of some key tumor suppressor genes, a process known as epigenetic addiction.

Hypomethylation of CpG dinucleotides in other parts of the genome leads to chromosome instability due to mechanisms such as loss of imprinting and reactivation of transposable elements. Loss of imprinting of insulin-like growth factor gene (IGF2) increases risk of colorectal cancer and is associated with Beckwith-Wiedemann syndrome which significantly increases the risk of cancer for newborns. In healthy cells, CpG dinucleotides of lower densities are found within coding and non-coding intergenic regions. Expression of some repetitive sequences and meiotic recombination at centromeres are repressed through methylation

The entire genome of a cancerous cell contains significantly less methylcytosine than the genome of a healthy cell. In fact, cancer cell genomes have 20-50% less methylation at individual CpG dinucleotides across the genome. CpG islands found in promoter regions are usually protected from DNA methylation. In cancer cells CpG islands are hypomethylated The regions flanking CpG islands called CpG island shores are where most DNA methylation occurs in the CpG dinucleotide context. Cancer cells are deferentially methylated at CpG island shores. In cancer cells, hypermethylation in the CpG island shores move into CpG islands, or hypomethylation of CpG islands move into CpG island shores eliminating sharp epigenetic boundaries between these genetic elements. In cancer cells "global hypomethylation" due to disruption in DNA methyltransferases (DNMTs) may promote mitotic recombination and chromosome rearrangement, ultimately resulting in aneuploidy when the chromosomes fail to separate properly during mitosis.

CpG island methylation is important in regulation of gene expression, yet cytosine methylation can lead directly to destabilizing genetic mutations and a precancerous cellular state. Methylated cytosines make hydrolysis of the amine group and spontaneous conversion to thymine more favorable. They can cause aberrant recruitment of chromatin proteins. Cytosine methylations change the amount of UV light absorption of the nucleotide base, creating pyrimidine dimers. When mutation results in loss of heterozygosity at tumor suppressor gene sites, these genes may become inactive. Single base pair mutations during replication can also have detrimental effects.

=== Histone modification ===
Eukaryotic DNA has a complex structure. It is generally wrapped around special proteins called histones to form a structure called a nucleosome. A nucleosome consists of 2 sets of 4 histones: H2A, H2B, H3, and H4. Additionally, histone H1 contributes to DNA packaging outside of the nucleosome. Certain histone modifying enzymes can add or remove functional groups to the histones, and these modifications influence the level of transcription of the genes wrapped around those histones and the level of DNA replication. Histone modification profiles of healthy and cancerous cells tend to differ.

In comparison to healthy cells, cancerous cells exhibit decreased monoacetylated and trimethylated forms of histone H4 (decreased H4ac and H4me3). Additionally, mouse models have shown that a decrease in histone H4R3 asymmetric dimethylation (H4R3me2a) of the p19ARF promoter is correlated with more advanced cases of tumorigenesis and metastasis. In mouse models, the loss of histone H4 acetylation and trimethylation increases as tumor growth continues. Loss of histone H4 Lysine 16 acetylation (H4K16ac), which is a mark of aging at the telomeres, specifically loses its acetylation. Some scientists hope this particular loss of histone acetylation might be battled with a histone deacetylase (HDAC) inhibitor specific for SIRT1, an HDAC specific for H4K16.

Other histone marks associated with tumorigenesis include increased deacetylation (decreased acetylation) of histones H3 and H4, decreased trimethylation of histone H3 Lysine 4 (H3K4me3), and increased monomethylation of histone H3 Lysine 9 (H3K9me1) and trimethylation of histone H3 Lysine 27 (H3K27me3). These histone modifications can silence tumor suppressor genes despite the drop in methylation of the gene's CpG island (an event that normally activates genes).

Some research has focused on blocking the action of BRD4 on acetylated histones, which has been shown to increase the expression of the Myc protein, implicated in several cancers. The development process of the drug to bind to BRD4 is noteworthy for the collaborative, open approach the team is taking.

The tumor suppressor gene p53 regulates DNA repair and can induce apoptosis in dysregulated cells. E Soto-Reyes and F Recillas-Targa elucidated the importance of the CTCF protein in regulating p53 expression. CTCF, or CCCTC binding factor, is a zinc finger protein that insulates the p53 promoter from accumulating repressive histone marks. In certain types of cancer cells, the CTCF protein does not bind normally, and the p53 promoter accumulates repressive histone marks, causing p53 expression to decrease.

Mutations in the epigenetic machinery itself may occur as well, potentially responsible for the changing epigenetic profiles of cancerous cells. The histone variants of the H2A family are highly conserved in mammals, playing critical roles in regulating many nuclear processes by altering chromatin structure. One of the key H2A variants, H2A.X, marks DNA damage, facilitating the recruitment of DNA repair proteins to restore genomic integrity. Another variant, H2A.Z, plays an important role in both gene activation and repression. A high level of H2A.Z expression is detected in many cancers and is significantly associated with cellular proliferation and genomic instability. Histone variant macroH2A1 is important in the pathogenesis of many types of cancers, for instance in hepatocellular carcinoma. Other mechanisms include a decrease in H4K16ac may be caused by either a decrease in activity of a histone acetyltransferases (HATs) or an increase in deacetylation by SIRT1. Likewise, an inactivating frameshift mutation in HDAC2, a histone deacetylase that acts on many histone-tail lysines, has been associated with cancers showing altered histone acetylation patterns. These findings indicate a promising mechanism for altering epigenetic profiles through enzymatic inhibition or enhancement. A new emerging field that captures toxicological epigenetic changes as a result of the exposure to different compounds (drugs, food, and environment) is toxicoepigenetics. In this field, there is growing interest in mapping changes in histone modifications and their possible consequences.

DNA damage, caused by UV light, ionizing radiation, environmental toxins, and metabolic chemicals, can also lead to genomic instability and cancer. The DNA damage response to double strand DNA breaks (DSB) is mediated in part by histone modifications. At a DSB, MRE11-RAD50-NBS1 (MRN) protein complex recruits ataxia telangiectasia mutated (ATM) kinase which phosphorylates Serine 129 of Histone 2A. MDC1, mediator of DNA damage checkpoint 1, binds to the phosphopeptide, and phosphorylation of H2AX may spread by a positive feedback loop of MRN-ATM recruitment and phosphorylation. TIP60 acetylates the γH2AX, which is then polyubiquitylated. RAP80, a subunit of the DNA repair breast cancer type 1 susceptibility protein complex (BRCA1-A), binds ubiquitin attached to histones. BRCA1-A activity arrests the cell cycle at the G2/M checkpoint, allowing time for DNA repair, or apoptosis may be initiated.

=== MicroRNA gene silencing ===
In mammals, microRNAs (miRNAs) regulate about 60% of the transcriptional activity of protein-encoding genes. Some miRNAs also undergo methylation-associated silencing in cancer cells. Let-7 and miR15/16 play important roles in down-regulating RAS and BCL2 oncogenes, and their silencing occurs in cancer cells. Decreased expression of miR-125b1, a miRNA that functions as a tumor suppressor, was observed in prostate, ovarian, breast and glial cell cancers. In vitro experiments have shown that miR-125b1 targets two genes, HER2/neu and ESR1, that are linked to breast cancer. DNA methylation, specifically hypermethylation, is one of the main ways that the miR-125b1 is epigenetically silenced. In patients with breast cancer, hypermethylation of CpG islands located proximal to the transcription start site was observed. Loss of CTCF binding and an increase in repressive histone marks, H3K9me3 and H3K27me3, correlates with DNA methylation and miR-125b1 silencing. Mechanistically, CTCF may function as a boundary element to stop the spread of DNA methylation. Results from experiments conducted by Soto-Reyes et al. indicate a negative effect of methylation on the function and expression of miR-125b1. Therefore, they concluded that DNA methylation has a part in silencing the gene. Furthermore, some miRNA's are epigenetically silenced early on in breast cancer, and therefore these miRNA's could potentially be useful as tumor markers. The epigenetic silencing of miRNA genes by aberrant DNA methylation is a frequent event in cancer cells; almost one third of miRNA promoters active in normal mammary cells were found hypermethylated in breast cancer cells - that is a several fold greater proportion than is usually observed for protein coding genes.

== Metabolic recoding of epigenetics in cancer ==
Dysregulation of metabolism allows tumor cells to generate needed building blocks as well as to modulate epigenetic marks to support cancer initiation and progression. Cancer-induced metabolic changes alter the epigenetic landscape, especially modifications on histones and DNA, thereby promoting malignant transformation, adaptation to inadequate nutrition, and metastasis. In order to satisfy the biosynthetic demands of cancer cells, metabolic pathways are altered by manipulating oncogenes and tumor suppressive genes concurrently. The accumulation of certain metabolites in cancer can target epigenetic enzymes to globally alter the epigenetic landscape. Cancer-related metabolic changes lead to locus-specific recoding of epigenetic marks. Cancer epigenetics can be precisely reprogramed by cellular metabolism through 1) dose-responsive modulation of cancer epigenetics by metabolites; 2) sequence-specific recruitment of metabolic enzymes; and 3) targeting of epigenetic enzymes by nutritional signals. In addition to modulating metabolic programming on a molecular level, there are microenvironmental factors that can influence and effect metabolic recoding. These influences include nutritional, inflammatory, and the immune response of malignant tissues.

== MicroRNA and DNA repair ==
DNA damage appears to be the primary underlying cause of cancer. If DNA repair is deficient, DNA damage tends to accumulate. Such excess DNA damage can increase mutational errors during DNA replication due to error-prone translesion synthesis. Excess DNA damage can also increase epigenetic alterations due to errors during DNA repair. Such mutations and epigenetic alterations can give rise to cancer (see malignant neoplasms).

Germ line mutations in DNA repair genes cause only 2–5% of colon cancer cases. However, altered expression of microRNAs, causing DNA repair deficiencies, are frequently associated with cancers and may be an important causal factor for these cancers.

Over-expression of certain miRNAs may directly reduce expression of specific DNA repair proteins. Wan et al. referred to 6 DNA repair genes that are directly targeted by the miRNAs indicated in parentheses: ATM (miR-421), RAD52 (miR-210, miR-373), RAD23B (miR-373), MSH2 (miR-21), BRCA1 (miR-182) and P53 (miR-504, miR-125b). More recently, Tessitore et al. listed further DNA repair genes that are directly targeted by additional miRNAs, including ATM (miR-18a, miR-101), DNA-PK (miR-101), ATR (miR-185), Wip1 (miR-16), MLH1, MSH2 and MSH6 (miR-155), ERCC3 and ERCC4 (miR-192) and UNG2 (mir-16, miR-34c and miR-199a). Of these miRNAs, miR-16, miR-18a, miR-21, miR-34c, miR-125b, miR-101, miR-155, miR-182, miR-185 and miR-192 are among those identified by Schnekenburger and Diederich as over-expressed in colon cancer through epigenetic hypomethylation. Over expression of any one of these miRNAs can cause reduced expression of its target DNA repair gene.

Up to 15% of the MLH1-deficiencies in sporadic colon cancers appeared to be due to over-expression of the microRNA miR-155, which represses MLH1 expression. However, the majority of 68 sporadic colon cancers with reduced expression of the DNA mismatch repair protein MLH1 were found to be deficient due to epigenetic methylation of the CpG island of the MLH1 gene.

In 28% of glioblastomas, the MGMT DNA repair protein is deficient but the MGMT promoter is not methylated. In the glioblastomas without methylated MGMT promoters, the level of microRNA miR-181d is inversely correlated with protein expression of MGMT and the direct target of miR-181d is the MGMT mRNA 3'UTR (the three prime untranslated region of MGMT mRNA). Thus, in 28% of glioblastomas, increased expression of miR-181d and reduced expression of DNA repair enzyme MGMT may be a causal factor. In 29–66% of glioblastomas, DNA repair is deficient due to epigenetic methylation of the MGMT gene, which reduces protein expression of MGMT.

High mobility group A (HMGA) proteins, characterized by an AT-hook, are small, nonhistone, chromatin-associated proteins that can modulate transcription. MicroRNAs control the expression of HMGA proteins, and these proteins (HMGA1 and HMGA2) are architectural chromatin transcription-controlling elements. Palmieri et al. showed that, in normal tissues, HGMA1 and HMGA2 genes are targeted (and thus strongly reduced in expression) by miR-15, miR-16, miR-26a, miR-196a2 and Let-7a.

HMGA expression is almost undetectable in differentiated adult tissues but is elevated in many cancers. HGMA proteins are polypeptides of ~100 amino acid residues characterized by a modular sequence organization. These proteins have three highly positively charged regions, termed AT hooks, that bind the minor groove of AT-rich DNA stretches in specific regions of DNA. Human neoplasias, including thyroid, prostatic, cervical, colorectal, pancreatic and ovarian carcinoma, show a strong increase of HMGA1a and HMGA1b proteins. Transgenic mice with HMGA1 targeted to lymphoid cells develop aggressive lymphoma, showing that high HMGA1 expression is not only associated with cancers, but that the HMGA1 gene can act as an oncogene to cause cancer. Baldassarre et al., showed that HMGA1 protein binds to the promoter region of DNA repair gene BRCA1 and inhibits BRCA1 promoter activity. They also showed that while only 11% of breast tumors had hypermethylation of the BRCA1 gene, 82% of aggressive breast cancers have low BRCA1 protein expression, and most of these reductions were due to chromatin remodeling by high levels of HMGA1 protein.

HMGA2 protein specifically targets the promoter of ERCC1, thus reducing expression of this DNA repair gene. ERCC1 protein expression was deficient in 100% of 47 evaluated colon cancers (though the extent to which HGMA2 was involved is unknown).

Palmieri et al. showed that each of the miRNAs that target HMGA genes are drastically reduced in almost all human pituitary adenomas studied, when compared with the normal pituitary gland. Consistent with the down-regulation of these HMGA-targeting miRNAs, an increase in the HMGA1 and HMGA2-specific mRNAs was observed. Three of these microRNAs (miR-16, miR-196a and Let-7a) have methylated promoters and therefore low expression in colon cancer. For two of these, miR-15 and miR-16, the coding regions are epigenetically silenced in cancer due to histone deacetylase activity. When these microRNAs are expressed at a low level, then HMGA1 and HMGA2 proteins are expressed at a high level. HMGA1 and HMGA2 target (reduce expression of) BRCA1 and ERCC1 DNA repair genes. Thus DNA repair can be reduced, likely contributing to cancer progression.

== DNA repair pathways ==
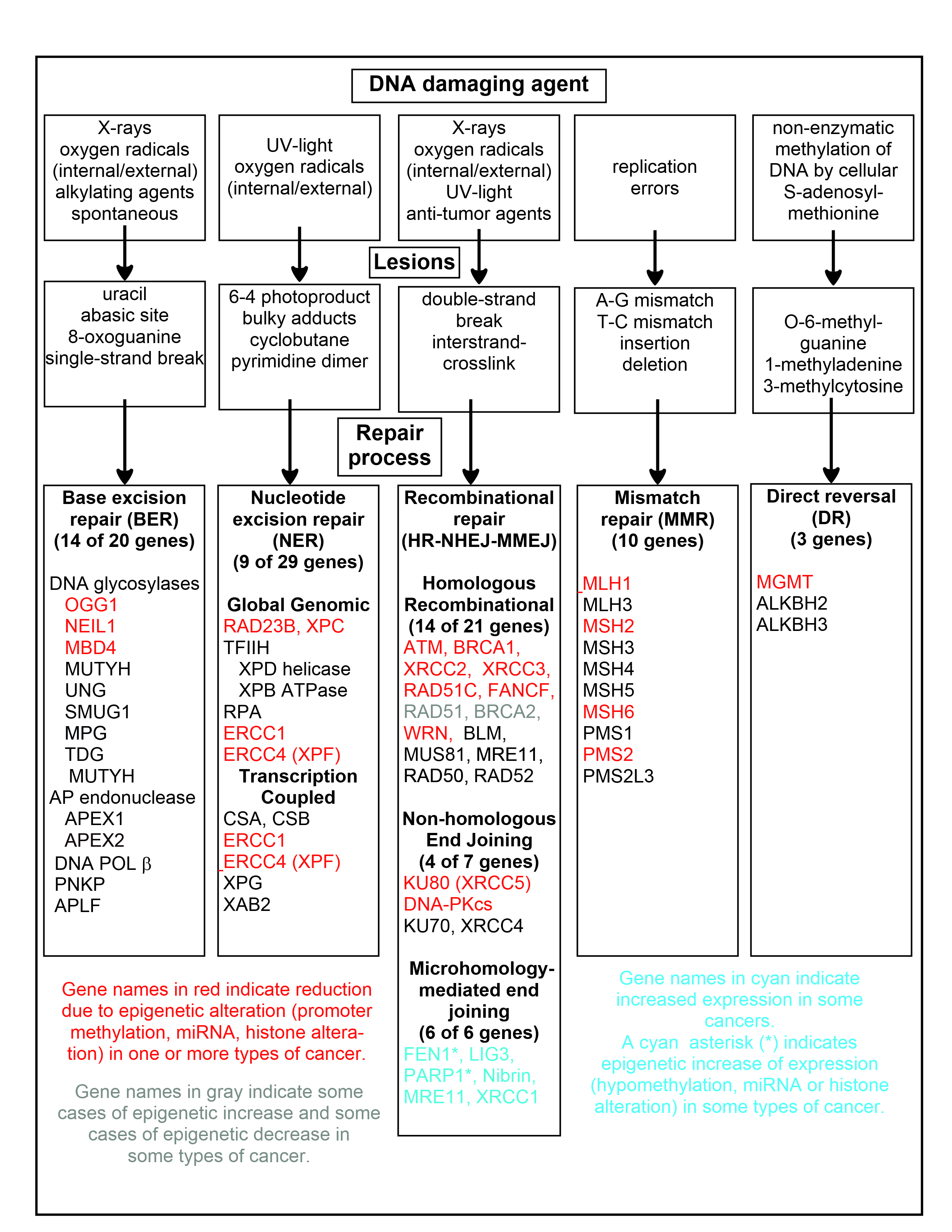
A chart of common DNA damaging agents, examples of lesions they cause in DNA, and pathways used to repair these lesions. Also shown are many of the genes in these pathways, an indication of which genes are epigenetically regulated to have reduced (or increased) expression in various cancers. It also shows genes in the error prone microhomology-mediated end joining pathway with increased expression in various cancers.

The chart at right shows some frequent DNA damaging agents, examples of DNA lesions they cause, and the pathways that deal with these DNA damages. At least 169 enzymes are either directly employed in DNA repair or influence DNA repair processes. Of these, 83 are directly employed in repairing the 5 types of DNA damages illustrated in the chart.

Some of the more well studied genes central to these repair processes are shown in the chart. The gene designations shown in red, gray or cyan indicate genes frequently epigenetically altered in various types of cancers. Two broad experimental survey articles also document most of these epigenetic DNA repair deficiencies in cancers.

Red-highlighted genes are frequently reduced or silenced by epigenetic mechanisms in various cancers. When these genes have low or absent expression, DNA damages can accumulate. Replication errors past these damages (see translesion synthesis) can lead to increased mutations and, ultimately, cancer. Epigenetic repression of DNA repair genes in accurate DNA repair pathways appear to be central to carcinogenesis.

The two gray-highlighted genes RAD51 and BRCA2, are required for homologous recombinational repair. They are sometimes epigenetically over-expressed and sometimes under-expressed in certain cancers. These cancers ordinarily have epigenetic deficiencies in other DNA repair genes such as RAD51 and BRCA2. These repair deficiencies would likely cause increased unrepaired DNA damages. The over-expression of RAD51 and BRCA2 seen in these cancers may reflect selective pressures for compensatory RAD51 or BRCA2 over-expression and increased homologous recombinational repair to at least partially deal with such excess DNA damages. In those cases where RAD51 or BRCA2 are under-expressed, this would itself lead to increased unrepaired DNA damages. Replication errors past these damages (see translesion synthesis) could cause increased mutations and cancer, so that under-expression of RAD51 or BRCA2 would be carcinogenic in itself.

Cyan-highlighted genes are in the microhomology-mediated end joining (MMEJ) pathway and are up-regulated in cancer. MMEJ is an additional error-prone inaccurate repair pathway for double-strand breaks. In MMEJ repair of a double-strand break, an homology of 5-25 complementary base pairs between both paired strands is sufficient to align the strands, but mismatched ends (flaps) are usually present. MMEJ removes the extra nucleotides (flaps) where strands are joined, and then ligates the strands to create an intact DNA double helix. MMEJ almost always involves at least a small deletion, so that it is a mutagenic pathway. FEN1, the flap endonuclease in MMEJ, is epigenetically increased by promoter hypomethylation and is over-expressed in the majority of cancers of the breast, prostate, stomach, neuroblastomas, pancreas, and lung. PARP1 is also over-expressed when its promoter region ETS site is epigenetically hypomethylated, and this contributes to progression to endometrial cancer, BRCA-mutated ovarian cancer, and BRCA-mutated serous ovarian cancer. Other genes in the MMEJ pathway are also over-expressed in a number of cancers (see MMEJ for summary), and are also shown in blue.

=== Frequencies of epimutations in DNA repair genes ===
Deficiencies in DNA repair proteins that function in accurate DNA repair pathways increase the risk of mutation. Mutation rates are strongly increased in cells with mutations in DNA mismatch repair or in homologous recombinational repair (HRR). Individuals with inherited mutations in any of 34 DNA repair genes are at increased risk of cancer (see DNA repair defects and increased cancer risk).

In sporadic cancers, a deficiency in DNA repair is occasionally found to be due to a mutation in a DNA repair gene, but much more frequently reduced or absent expression of DNA repair genes is due to epigenetic alterations that reduce or silence gene expression. For example, for 113 colorectal cancers examined in sequence, only four had a missense mutation in the DNA repair gene MGMT, while the majority had reduced MGMT expression due to methylation of the MGMT promoter region (an epigenetic alteration). Similarly, out of 119 cases of mismatch repair-deficient colorectal cancers that lacked DNA repair gene PMS2 expression, PMS2 protein was deficient in 6 due to mutations in the PMS2 gene, while in 103 cases PMS2 expression was deficient because its pairing partner MLH1 was repressed due to promoter methylation (PMS2 protein is unstable in the absence of MLH1). In the other 10 cases, loss of PMS2 expression was likely due to epigenetic overexpression of the microRNA, miR-155, which down-regulates MLH1.

Epigenetic defects in DNA repair genes are frequent in cancers. In the table, multiple cancers were evaluated for reduced or absent expression of the DNA repair gene of interest, and the frequency shown is the frequency with which the cancers had an epigenetic deficiency of gene expression. Such epigenetic deficiencies likely arise early in carcinogenesis, since they are also frequently found (though at somewhat lower frequency) in the field defect surrounding the cancer from which the cancer likely arose (see Table).

Frequency of epigenetic reduction in DNA repair gene expression in sporadic cancers and in adjacent field defects
Cancer	Gene	Frequency in cancer	Frequency in field defect	Ref.
Colorectal	MGMT	46%	34%	
Colorectal	MGMT	47%	11%	
Colorectal	MGMT	70%	60%	
Colorectal	MSH2	13%	5%	
Colorectal	ERCC1	100%	40%	
Colorectal	PMS2	88%	50%	
Colorectal	XPF	55%	40%	
Head and Neck	MGMT	54%	38%	
Head and Neck	MLH1	33%	25%	
Head and Neck	MLH1	31%	20%	
Stomach	MGMT	88%	78%	
Stomach	MLH1	73%	20%	
Stomach	ERCC1	95-100%	14-65%	
Stomach	PMS2	95-100%	14-60%	
Esophagus	MLH1	77%–100%	23%–79%	

It appears that cancers may frequently be initiated by an epigenetic reduction in expression of one or more DNA repair enzymes. Reduced DNA repair likely allows accumulation of DNA damages. Error prone translesion synthesis past some of these DNA damages may give rise to a mutation with a selective advantage. A clonal patch with a selective advantage may grow and out-compete neighboring cells, forming a field defect. While there is no obvious selective advantage for a cell to have reduced DNA repair, the epimutation of the DNA repair gene may be carried along as a passenger when the cells with the selectively advantageous mutation are replicated. In the cells carrying both the epimutation of the DNA repair gene and the mutation with the selective advantage, further DNA damages will accumulate, and these could, in turn, give rise to further mutations with still greater selective advantages. Epigenetic defects in DNA repair may thus contribute to the characteristic high frequency of mutations in the genomes of cancers, and cause their carcinogenic progression.

Cancers have high levels of genome instability, associated with a high frequency of mutations. A high frequency of genomic mutations increases the likelihood of particular mutations occurring that activate oncogenes and inactivate tumor suppressor genes, leading to carcinogenesis. On the basis of whole genome sequencing, cancers are found to have thousands to hundreds of thousands of mutations in their whole genomes. (Also see Mutation frequencies in cancers.) By comparison, the mutation frequency in the whole genome between generations for humans (parent to child) is about 70 new mutations per generation. In the protein coding regions of the genome, there are only about 0.35 mutations between parent/child generations (less than one mutated protein per generation). Whole genome sequencing in blood cells for a pair of identical twin 100-year-old centenarians only found 8 somatic differences, though somatic variation occurring in less than 20% of blood cells would be undetected.

While DNA damages may give rise to mutations through error prone translesion synthesis, DNA damages can also give rise to epigenetic alterations during faulty DNA repair processes. The DNA damages that accumulate due to epigenetic DNA repair defects can be a source of the increased epigenetic alterations found in many genes in cancers. In an early study, looking at a limited set of transcriptional promoters, Fernandez et al. examined the DNA methylation profiles of 855 primary tumors. Comparing each tumor type with its corresponding normal tissue, 729 CpG island sites (55% of the 1322 CpG sites evaluated) showed differential DNA methylation. Of these sites, 496 were hypermethylated (repressed) and 233 were hypomethylated (activated). Thus, there is a high level of epigenetic promoter methylation alterations in tumors. Some of these epigenetic alterations may contribute to cancer progression.

== Epigenetic carcinogens ==
A variety of compounds are considered as epigenetic carcinogens—they result in an increased incidence of tumors, but they do not show mutagen activity (toxic compounds or pathogens that cause tumors incident to increased regeneration should also be excluded). Examples include diethylstilbestrol, arsenite, hexachlorobenzene, and nickel compounds.

Many teratogens exert specific effects on the fetus by epigenetic mechanisms. While epigenetic effects may preserve the effect of a teratogen such as diethylstilbestrol throughout the life of an affected child, the possibility of birth defects resulting from exposure of fathers or in second and succeeding generations of offspring has generally been rejected on theoretical grounds and for lack of evidence. However, a range of male-mediated abnormalities have been demonstrated, and more are likely to exist. FDA label information for Vidaza, a formulation of 5-azacitidine (an unmethylatable analog of cytidine that causes hypomethylation when incorporated into DNA) states that "men should be advised not to father a child" while using the drug, citing evidence in treated male mice of reduced fertility, increased embryo loss, and abnormal embryo development. In rats, endocrine differences were observed in offspring of males exposed to morphine. In mice, second generation effects of diethylstilbestrol have been described occurring by epigenetic mechanisms.

== Cancer subtypes ==
=== Skin cancer ===
Melanoma is a deadly skin cancer that originates from melanocytes. Several epigenetic alterations are known to play a role in the transition of melanocytes to melanoma cells. This includes DNA methylation that can be inherited without making changes to the DNA sequence, as well as silencing the tumor suppressor genes in the epidermis that have been exposed to UV radiation for periods of time. The silencing of tumor suppressor genes leads to photocarcinogenesis which is associated to epigenetic alterations in DNA methylation, DNA methyltransferases, and histone acetylation. These alterations are the consequence of deregulation of their corresponding enzymes. Several histone methyltransferases and demethylases are among these enzymes.

=== Prostate cancer ===
Prostate cancer kills around 35,000 men yearly, and about 220,000 men are diagnosed with prostate cancer per year, in North America alone. Prostate cancer is the second leading cause of cancer-caused fatalities in men, and within a man's lifetime, one in six men will have the disease. Alterations in histone acetylation and DNA methylation occur in various genes influencing prostate cancer, and have been seen in genes involved in hormonal response. More than 90% of prostate cancers show gene silencing by CpG island hypermethylation of the GSTP1 gene promoter, which protects prostate cells from genomic damage that is caused by different oxidants or carcinogens. Real-time methylation-specific polymerase chain reaction (PCR) suggests that many other genes are also hypermethylated. Gene expression in the prostate may be modulated by nutrition and lifestyle changes.

=== Cervical cancer ===
The second most common malignant tumor in women is invasive cervical cancer (ICC) and more than 50% of all invasive cervical cancer (ICC) is caused by oncogenic human papillomavirus 16 (HPV16). Furthermore, cervix intraepithelial neoplasia (CIN) is primarily caused by oncogenic HPV16. As in many cases, the causative factor for cancer does not always take a direct route from infection to the development of cancer. Genomic methylation patterns have been associated with invasive cervical cancer. Within the HPV16L1 region, 14 tested CpG sites have significantly higher methylation in CIN3+ than in HPV16 genomes of women without CIN3. Only 2/16 CpG sites tested in HPV16 upstream regulatory region were found to have association with increased methylation in CIN3+. This suggests that the direct route from infection to cancer is sometimes detoured to a precancerous state in cervix intraepithelial neoplasia. Additionally, increased CpG site methylation was found in low levels in most of the five host nuclear genes studied, including 5/5 TERT, 1/4 DAPK1, 2/5 RARB, MAL, and CADM1. Furthermore, 1/3 of CpG sites in mitochondrial DNA were associated with increased methylation in CIN3+. Thus, a correlation exists between CIN3+ and increased methylation of CpG sites in the HPV16 L1 open reading frame. This could be a potential biomarker for future screens of cancerous and precancerous cervical disease.

=== Leukemia ===
Recent studies have shown that the mixed-lineage leukemia (MLL) gene causes leukemia by rearranging and fusing with other genes in different chromosomes, which is a process under epigenetic control. Mutations in MLL block the correct regulatory regions in leukemia associated translocations or insertions causing malignant transformation controlled by HOX genes. This is what leads to the increase in white blood cells. Leukemia related genes are managed by the same pathways that control epigenetics, signaling transduction, transcriptional regulation, and energy metabolism. It was indicated that infections, electromagnetic fields and increased birth weight can contribute to being the causes of leukemia.

=== Sarcoma ===
There are about 15,000 new cases of sarcoma in the US each year, and about 6,200 people were projected to die of sarcoma in the US in 2014. Sarcomas comprise a large number of rare, histogenetically heterogeneous mesenchymal tumors that, for example, include chondrosarcoma, Ewing's sarcoma, leiomyosarcoma, liposarcoma, osteosarcoma, synovial sarcoma, and (alveolar and embryonal) rhabdomyosarcoma. Several oncogenes and tumor suppressor genes are epigenetically altered in sarcomas. These include APC, CDKN1A, CDKN2A, CDKN2B, Ezrin, FGFR1, GADD45A, MGMT, STK3, STK4, PTEN, RASSF1A, WIF1, as well as several miRNAs. Expression of epigenetic modifiers such as that of the BMI1 component of the PRC1 complex is deregulated in chondrosarcoma, Ewing's sarcoma, and osteosarcoma, and expression of the EZH2 component of the PRC2 complex is altered in Ewing's sarcoma and rhabdomyosarcoma. Similarly, expression of another epigenetic modifier, the LSD1 histone demethylase, is increased in chondrosarcoma, Ewing's sarcoma, osteosarcoma, and rhabdomyosarcoma. Drug targeting and inhibition of EZH2 in Ewing's sarcoma, or of LSD1 in several sarcomas, inhibits tumor cell growth in these sarcomas.

=== Lung Cancer ===
Lung cancer is the second most common type of cancer and leading cause of death in men and women in the United States, it is estimated that there is about 216,000 new cases and 160,000 deaths due to lung cancer.

Initiation and progression of lung carcinoma is the result of the interaction between genetic, epigenetic and environmental factors. Most cases of lung cancer are because of genetic mutations in EGFR, KRAS, STK11 (also known as LKB1), TP53 (also known as p53), and CDKN2A (also known as p16 or INK4a) with the most common type of lung cancer being an inactivation at p16. p16 is a tumor suppressor protein that occurs in mostly in humans the functional significance of the mutations was tested on many other species including mice, cats, dogs, monkeys and cows the identification of these multiple nonoverlapping clones was not entirely surprising since the reduced stringency hybridization of a zoo blot with the same probe also revealed 10-15 positive EcoRI fragments in all species tested.

== Identification methods ==
Previously, epigenetic profiles were limited to individual genes under scrutiny by a particular research team. Recently, however, scientists have been moving toward a more genomic approach to determine an entire genomic profile for cancerous versus healthy cells.

Popular approaches for measuring CpG methylation in cells include:

- Bisulfite sequencing
- Combined bisulfite restriction analysis (COBRA)
- Methylation-specific PCR
- MethyLight
- Pyrosequencing
- Restriction landmark genomic scanning
- Arbitrary primed PCR
- HELP assay (HpaII tiny fragment enrichment by ligation-mediated PCR)
- Chromatin immunoprecipitation ChIP-Chip using antibodies specific for methyl-CpG binding domain proteins
- Methylated DNA immunoprecipitation Methyl-DIP
- Gene-expression profiles via DNA microarray : comparing mRNA levels from cancer cell lines before and after treatment with a demethylating agent

Since bisulfite sequencing is considered the gold standard for measuring CpG methylation, when one of the other methods is used, results are usually confirmed using bisulfite sequencing[1]. Popular approaches for determining histone modification profiles in cancerous versus healthy cells include:

- Mass spectrometry
- Chromatin Immunoprecipitation Assay

== Diagnosis and prognosis ==
Researchers are hoping to identify specific epigenetic profiles of various types and subtypes of cancer with the goal of using these profiles as tools to diagnose individuals more specifically and accurately. Since epigenetic profiles change, scientists would like to use the different epigenomic profiles to determine the stage of development or level of aggressiveness of a particular cancer in patients. For example, hypermethylation of the genes coding for Death-Associated Protein Kinase (DAPK), p16, and Epithelial Membrane Protein 3 (EMP3) have been linked to more aggressive forms of lung, colorectal, and brain cancers. This type of knowledge can affect the way that doctors will diagnose and choose to treat their patients.

Another factor that will influence the treatment of patients is knowing how well they will respond to certain treatments. Personalized epigenomic profiles of cancerous cells can provide insight into this field. For example, MGMT is an enzyme that reverses the addition of alkyl groups to the nucleotide guanine. Alkylating guanine, however, is the mechanism by which several chemotherapeutic drugs act in order to disrupt DNA and cause cell death. Therefore, if the gene encoding MGMT in cancer cells is hypermethylated and in effect silenced or repressed, the chemotherapeutic drugs that act by methylating guanine will be more effective than in cancer cells that have a functional MGMT enzyme.

Epigenetic biomarkers can also be utilized as tools for molecular prognosis. In primary tumor and mediastinal lymph node biopsy samples, hypermethylation of both CDKN2A and CDH13 serves as the marker for increased risk of faster cancer relapse and higher death rate of patients.

== Treatment ==
Decitabine

Epigenetic control of the proto-onco regions and the tumor suppressor sequences by conformational changes in histones plays a role in the formation and progression of cancer. Pharmaceuticals that reverse epigenetic changes might have a role in a variety of cancers.

Recently, it is evidently known that associations between specific cancer histotypes and epigenetic changes can facilitate the development of novel epi-drugs. Drug development has focused mainly on modifying DNA methyltransferase, histone acetyltransferase (HAT) and histone deacetylase (HDAC).

Drugs that specifically target the inverted methylation pattern of cancerous cells include the DNA methyltransferase inhibitors azacitidine and decitabine. These hypomethylating agents are used to treat myelodysplastic syndrome, a blood cancer produced by abnormal bone marrow stem cells. These agents inhibit all three types of active DNA methyltransferases, and had been thought to be highly toxic, but proved to be effective when used in low dosage, reducing progression of myelodysplastic syndrome to leukemia.

Histone deacetylase (HDAC) inhibitors show efficacy in treatment of T cell lymphoma. two HDAC inhibitors, vorinostat and romidepsin, have been approved by the Food and Drug Administration. However, since these HDAC inhibitors alter the acetylation state of many proteins in addition to the histone of interest, knowledge of the underlying mechanism at the molecular level of patient response is required to enhance the efficiency of using such inhibitors as treatment. Treatment with HDAC inhibitors has been found to promote gene reactivation after DNA methyl-transferases inhibitors have repressed transcription. Panobinostat is approved for certain situations in myeloma.

Other pharmaceutical targets in research are histone lysine methyltransferases (KMT) and protein arginine methyltransferases (PRMT). Preclinical study has suggested that lunasin may have potentially beneficial epigenetic effects.

== Epigenetic Therapy ==
Epigenetic therapy of cancer has shown to be a promising and possible treatment of cancerous cells. Epigenetic inactivation is an ideal target for cancerous cells because it targets genes imperative for controlling cell growth, specifically cancer cell growth. It is crucial for these genes to be reactivated in order to suppress tumor growth and sensitize the cells to cancer curing therapies. Typical chemotherapy aims to kill and eliminate cancer cells in the body. Cancer initiated by genetic alterations of cells are typically permanent and nearly impossible to reverse, this differs from epigenetic cancer because the cancer causing epigenetic aberrations have the capability of being reversed, and the cells being returned to normal function. The ability for epigenetic mechanisms to be reversed is attributed to the fact that the coding of the genes being silenced through histone and DNA modification is not being altered.

There are two primary types of epigenetic alterations in cancer cells, these are known as DNA methylation and Histone modification. It is the goal of epigenetic therapies to inhibit these alterations. DNA Methyltransferases (DNMTs) and Histone Deacetylases (HDAC) are the primary catalyzes of the epigenetic modifications of cancer cells. The goal for epigenetic therapies is to repress this methylation and reverse these modifications in order to create a new epigenome where cancer cells no longer thrive and tumor suppression is the new function. Synthetic drugs are used as tools in epigenetic therapies due to their ability to inhibit enzymes causing histone modifications and DNA methylations. Combination therapy is one method of epigenetic therapy which involves the use of more than one synthetic drug, these drugs include a low dose DNMT inhibitor as well as an HDAC inhibitor. Together, these drugs are able to target the linkage between DNA methylation and Histone modification.

The goal of epigenetic therapies for cancer in relation to DNA methylation is to both decrease the methylation of DNA and in turn decrease the silencing of genes related to tumor suppression. The term associated with decreasing the methylation of DNA will be known as hypomethylation. The Food and Drug Administration (FDA) has currently approved one hypomethylating agent which, through the conduction of clinical trials, has shown promising results when utilized to treat patients with Myelodysplastic Syndrome (MDS). This hypomethylating agent is known as the doozy analogue of 5-azacytidine and works to promote hypomethylation by targeting all DNA methyltransferases for degradation.

== See also ==
- Pharmacoepigenetics
- Regulation of transcription in cancer
