= GS-7 =

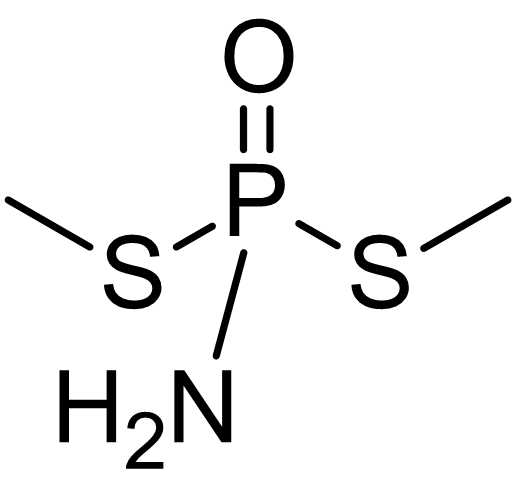

Names
- Other names S,S-dimethyl phosphoramidodithioate

Identifiers
3D model (JSmol)	Interactive image
ChemSpider	16093132
PubChem CID	15151768
- InChI: InChI=1S/C2H8NOPS2/c1-6-5(3,4)7-2/h1-2H3,(H2,3,4) Key: BYWRZYACOWEUCQ-UHFFFAOYSA-N
- SMILES: CSP(=O)(N)SC

Properties
Chemical formula	C_{2}H_{8}NOPS_{2}
Molar mass	157.19 g·mol^{−1}
- Except where otherwise noted, data are given for materials in their standard state (at 25 °C [77 °F], 100 kPa). Infobox references

GS-7 is an organophosphorus anticholinesterase related to the organophosphate insecticide methamidophos.

== See also ==
- Tabun
- Dimefox
- Mipafox
- Schradan
- MSPI
