= MSPI =

MSPI may refer to:

- MSPI (nerve agent), an irreversible acetylcholinesterase inhibitor
- mini-SPI (mSPI), a synchronous serial communication protocol`
- MspI, a restriction enzyme used in various methods such as the HELP assay
- Milk soy protein intolerance, a combination allergic intolerance to proteins in both dairy and soy milk; see Milk allergy#Cross-reactivity with soy
