= Small integral membrane protein 14 =

SMIM14

Identifiers
- Aliases: SMIM14, C4orf34, small integral membrane protein 14
- External IDs: MGI: 1915802; GeneCards: SMIM14

Gene location (Human)
Chr.	Chromosome 4 (human)
Band	4p14	Start	39,546,336 bp
Band	4p14	End	39,638,902 bp

Gene location (Mouse)
Chr.	Chromosome 5 (mouse)
Band	5|5 C3.1	Start	65,446,844 bp
Band	5|5 C3.1	End	65,537,184 bp
RNA expression pattern
Bgee	Human / Mouse (ortholog); Top expressed in: corpus epididymis; caput epididymis; sperm; mucosa of ileum; synovial joint; pancreatic epithelial cell; bronchial epithelial cell; skin of arm; epithelium of nasopharynx; tendon of biceps brachii / Top expressed in: parotid gland; lacrimal gland; seminal vesicula; ascending aorta; aortic valve; prostate; lobe of prostate; submandibular gland; secondary oocyte; iris; More reference expression data
BioGPS	n/a
Gene ontology
Molecular function	protein binding
Cellular component	membrane; endoplasmic reticulum membrane; integral component of membrane; endoplasmic reticulum
Biological process	blastocyst hatching
Sources:Amigo / QuickGO
Orthologs
Databases	NCBI: entry; OMA: entry
Species	Human	Mouse
Entrez	201895	68552
Ensembl	ENSG00000163683	ENSMUSG00000037822
UniProt	Q96QK8	Q91VT8
RefSeq (mRNA)	NM_174921; NM_001317896; NM_001317897	NM_133697
RefSeq (protein)	NP_001304825; NP_001304826; NP_777581	NP_598458; NP_001363900; NP_001363901; NP_001363902; NP_001363903 NP_001363904; NP_001363905; NP_001363906; NP_001363907; NP_001363908
Location (UCSC)	Chr 4: 39.55 – 39.64 Mb	Chr 5: 65.45 – 65.54 Mb
PubMed search
- Wikidata
View/Edit Human	View/Edit Mouse

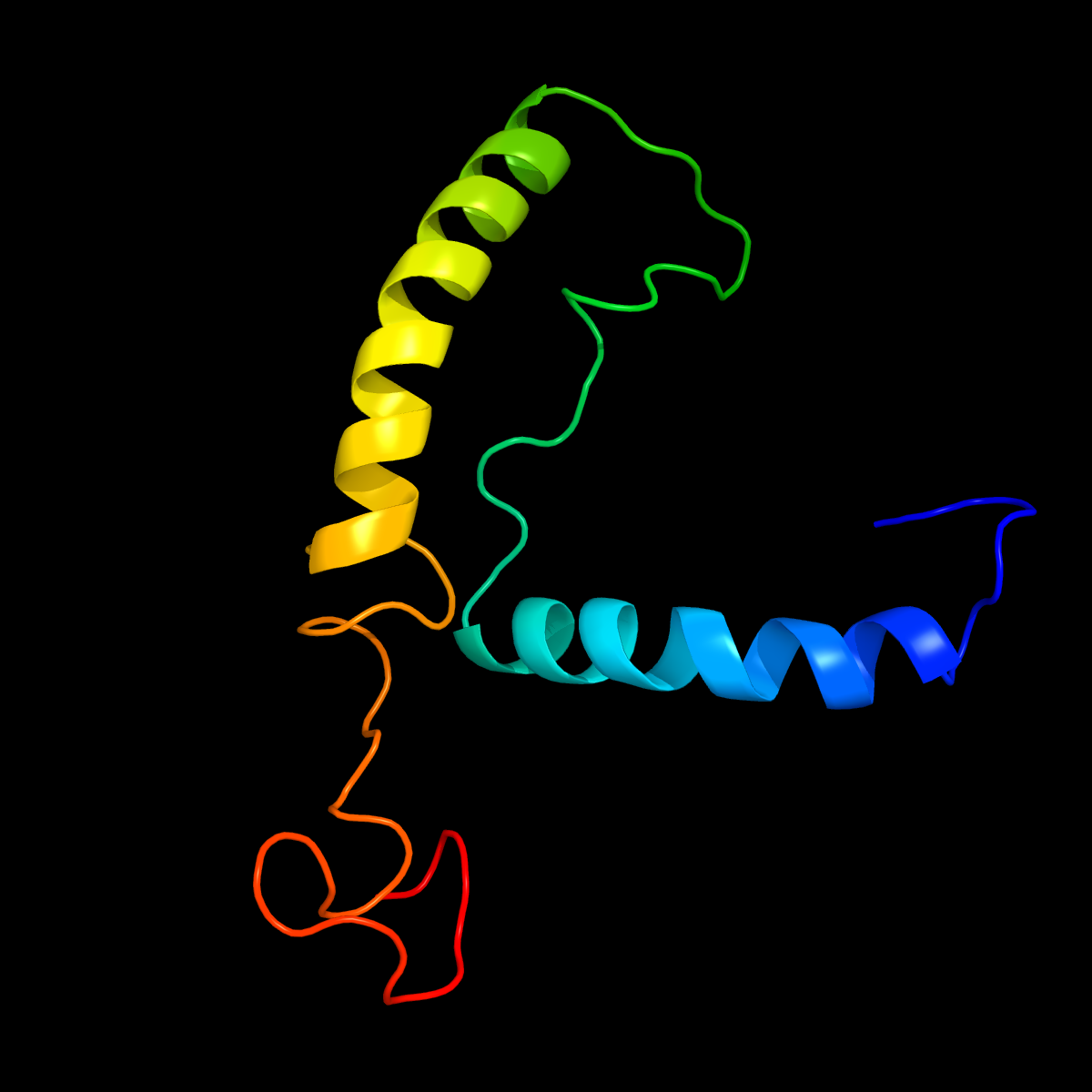
3-D rendering of SMIM14 protein via Phyre2

Small integral membrane protein 14, also known as SMIM14 or C4orf34, is a protein encoded on chromosome 4 of the human genome by the SMIM14 gene. SMIM14 has at least 298 orthologs mainly found in jawed vertebrates and no paralogs. SMIM14 is classified as a type I transmembrane protein. While this protein is not well understood by the scientific community, the transmembrane domain of SMIM14 may be involved in ER retention.

== Gene ==
The SMIM14 gene is located on the minus strand at cytogenetic band 4p14 and is 92,567 base pairs in length. The gene has five exons, four of which constitute the open-reading frame for SMIM14.

The Kozak sequence, which functions as the protein translation initiation site in most eukaryotic mRNA transcripts, is considered a strong motif. There is no signal peptide in SMIM14, but the encoded transmembrane domain acts as the signal sequence. It is predicted that one disulfide bridge is encoded in SMIM14, which stabilizes the tertiary (and sometimes quaternary) structures of proteins. There are at least ten polyadenylation sequences in the 3’ UTR of the SMIM14 gene, indicating transcription termination.

SMIM14 is expressed at four-times the level of an average gene.

== Gene regulation ==
=== Promoter ===
SMIM14 has seven predicted promoter regions. The promoter with the greatest number of transcripts and CAGE tags is approximately 1,420 base pairs in length. It is found on the minus strand and has a start position at residue 39,638,806 and ends at residue 39,640,225. The identified promoter has five coding transcripts and a maximum of 105,458 CAGE tags from one of the transcripts.

Promoter ID	Start Position	End Position	Length (bp)	Coding Transcripts
GXP_150112	39,549,547	39,550,812	1,266	0
GXP_3198013	39,583,919	39,584,958	1,040	0
GXP_9520406	39,605,105	39,606,144	1,040	N/A
GXP_9520407	39,626,490	39,627,529	1,040	N/A
GXP_6750876	39,627,082	39,628,121	1,040	1
GXP_3198015	39,638,191	39,639,230	1,040	0
GXP_6750877	39,638,806	39,640,225	1,420	5

For the SMIM14 gene, the associated CpG sites are found in CpG island 76; additional transcription factors can bind to this promoter to drive SMIM14 gene expression.

Literature-curated Transcription Factors

(via ORegAnno)

SMARCA4
STAT1
RBL2
TRIM28
EGR1
TFAP2C

== RNA and expression ==
SMIM14 has three mRNA transcript variants. Transcript variant 1 is the longest variant, with 6,397 base pairs.

Transcript	Length (bp)	Accession number
Transcript variant 1	6,397	NM_001317896.2
Transcript variant 2	6,252	NM_174921
Transcript variant 3	6,263	NM_001317897

SMIM14 has high expression in the liver, adrenal gland, colon, and prostate. It is under-expressed in peripheral blood lymphocytes, skeletal muscles, and the heart.

== Protein ==
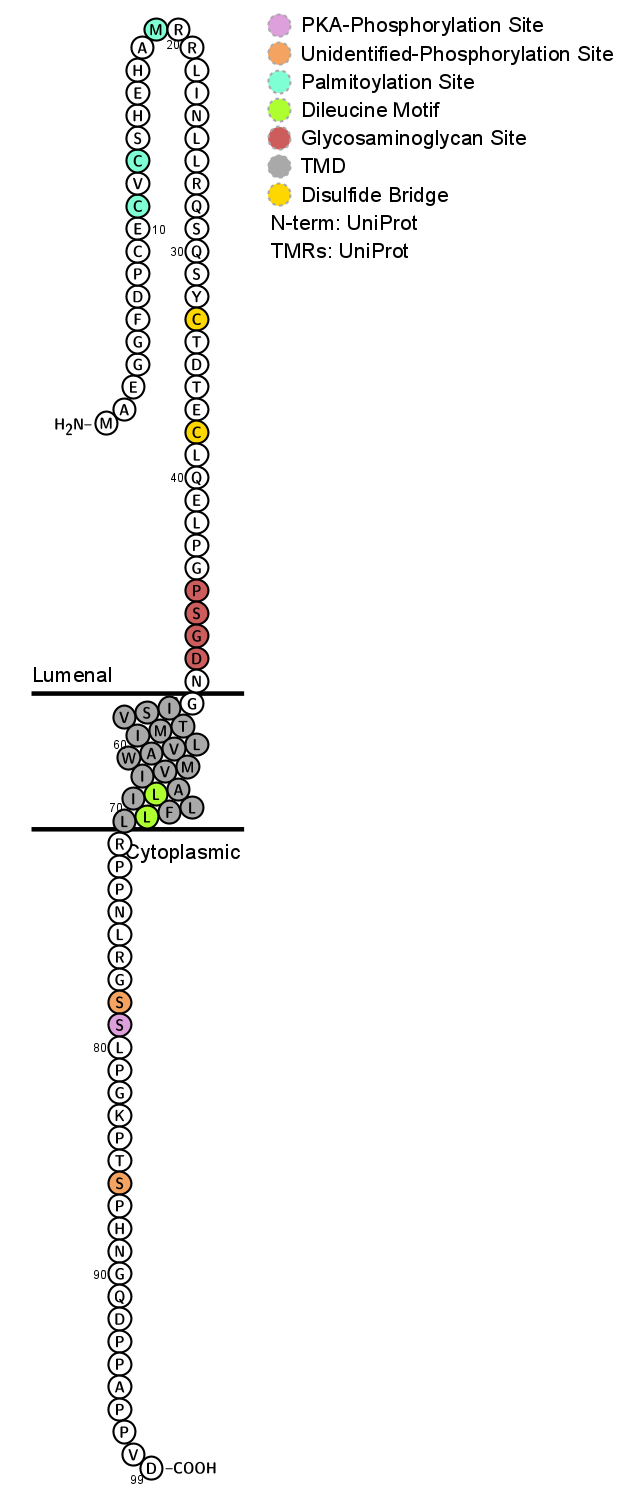
Visualization of SMIM14 protein with helical transmembrane domain (TMD) via the Protter web server.

From SMIM14, transcript variant 1, a protein of 99 amino acids is synthesized.

=== Primary structure ===
The predicted molecular weight (Mw) of the SMIM14 protein is 10710.34 Da. The SMIM14 protein carries no electrical charge at a pH value of 5.10 (i.e. isoelectric point, pI). The abundance of every amino acid is within the normal range for humans.

==== Transmembrane domain and motifs ====
The Kozak sequence is considered a strong motif.

SMIM14 has one transmembrane domain, so it is classified as a single-pass membrane protein. The transmembrane domain extends from residues 51–70. It is predicted that within the domain, there is a dileucine motif, which plays a role in the sorting of transmembrane proteins to endosomes and lysosomes. The N-terminus is positioned in the extracellular space, while the C-terminus is located inside the cell, further classifying SMIM14 as a type I transmembrane protein.

=== Secondary structure ===
It is predicted that there is an ɑ-helix within the transmembrane domain. It is also predicted that SMIM14 is randomly coiled near the C-terminus. A random coil is regarded as the protein's lack of a secondary structure, so it assumes a relaxed, non-interacting nor stabilizing conformation. It is also predicted that extended strands (E-strands) are throughout the protein. E-strands are a common secondary structure, as well, and are often characterized by their involvement in hydrogen bonding with polar side chains.

Within the N-terminus, SMIM14 is predicted to have three palmitoylation sites, which facilitates the clustering of proteins, and one disulfide bridge, stabilizing the structure of the protein. There is also a predicted glycosaminoglycan site spanning residues 45–48, proximal to the transmembrane domain. The C-terminus is predicted to have two unidentified phosphorylation sites and one PKA-phosphorylation site.

=== Subcellular location ===
SMIM14, a transmembrane protein, is usually expressed in the ER membrane. While there is no conventional ER retention signal within SMIM14 coding sequences, it has been suggested that the transmembrane domain mediates ER retention.

== Homology ==
SMIM14 has no known paralogs and at least 298 orthologs.

=== Paralogs ===
Through BLAST, it has been established that there are no paralogs of the SMIM14 gene in Homo sapiens.

=== Orthologs ===
SMIM14 is conserved in most vertebrates, excluding hagfish, lampreys, lobe-finned fish, and lungfish. For invertebrates, they are conserved in flatworms, roundworms, mollusks, and arthropods. It is also relatively conserved in distant relatives, such as sea anemones and corals.

Species	Common name	Taxons	DoD (mya)	% Identity	% Similarity	Corrected % Divergence (m)	Accession number
Mastomys coucha	Southern multimammate mouse	rodentia	90	87.9	98.0	12.9	XP_031198284.1
Phyllostomus discolor	pale spear-nosed bat	mammalia	96	93.4	99.0	6.70	XP_028361411.1
Manacus vitellinus	golden-collared manakin	aves	312	85.1	91.1	16.1	XP_017923893.1
Python bivittatus	Burmese python	reptilia	312	80.2	89.1	22.1	XP_007426519
Nanorana parkeri	high Himalaya frog	amphibia	352	69.2	79.8	36.8	XP_018420132.1
Danio rerio	zebrafish	actinopterygii	435	68.0	82.5	38.6	NP_991165.1
Rhincodon typus	whale shark	chondrichthyes	473	71.8	84.5	33.1	XP_020383770.1
Ciona intestinalis	sea vase	ascidiacea	676	42.7	55.3	85.1	XP_026690156.1
Strongylocentrotus purpuratus	Pacific purple sea urchin	echinodermata	684	50.5	68.0	68.3	XP_787363.2
Lingula anatina	lamp shell	brachiopoda	797	59.0	74.3	52.8	XP_013382479.1
Limulus polyphemus	Atlantic horseshoe crab	arthropoda	797	49.5	65.0	70.3	XP_013782563.1
Agrilus planipennis	emerald ash borer	insecta	797	39.8	57.3	92.1	XP_018319678.1
Octopus vulgaris	octopus	mollusca	797	51.0	64.4	67.3	XP_029637526.1
Strongyloides ratti	threadworm	nematoda	797	33.3	48.1	110	XP_024504825.1
Exaiptasia pallida	sea anemone	anthozoa	824	58.2	65.5	54.1	XP_020902189.1
Schistosoma haematobium	urinary blood fluke	platyhelminthes	824	37.4	53.3	98.3	XP_012793134.1

The sequence of the SMIM14 gene is highly conserved in orthologs proximal to the N-terminus. In stark contrast, the C-terminus is more varied across orthologs. Sequence analysis of the SMIM14 gene in humans suggests that the C-terminus encodes a disproportionate amount of proline residues (9 out of 29; 31%) with several proline-rich sequences (PXXP). Proline-rich domains are usually associated with protein-protein interactions; thus, the C-terminus has a high probability of interacting with proteins.

== Protein interactions ==
SMIM14 has been predicted to interact with the FATE1 protein, which is involved in the Ca^{2+} transfer from the ER to mitochondria, a regulatory mechanism for apoptosis. It has also been predicted that SMIM14 interacts with LSM4, a glycine-rich protein that plays a role in pre-mRNA splicing.
