= Thiosarin =

GBS

Names
- Other names O-Isopropyl methylphosphonofluoridothioate

Identifiers
CAS Number	4241-37-6
3D model (JSmol)	Interactive image
ChemSpider	4954329
PubChem CID	6451880
CompTox Dashboard (EPA)	DTXSID90962461
- InChI: InChI=1S/C4H10FOPS/c1-4(2)6-7(3,5)8/h4H,1-3H3 Key: HXRXYYVPIQXCPA-UHFFFAOYSA-N
- SMILES: CC(C)OP(=S)(C)F

Properties
Chemical formula	C_{4}H_{10}FOPS
Molar mass	156.16 g·mol^{−1}
- Except where otherwise noted, data are given for materials in their standard state (at 25 °C [77 °F], 100 kPa). Infobox references

Thiosarin, sulfursarin or GBS, is the organophosphorus compound with the formula CH_{3}P(S)(F)(OCH(CH_{3})_{2}). It is closely related to sarin (CH_{3}P(O)(F)(OCH(CH_{3})_{2})). It is an extremely toxic substance related to G-agents.

== Characteristics ==
Thiosarin belongs to the group of methylphosphonofluoridothioate nerve agents, comparatively less toxic than the standard G series. It is reported as a colorless liquid with a characteristic organosulfur odor when pure. It is estimated to have a boiling point of 144-167 °C. It is a more nonpolar compound, with a solubility in water of 7 g/L. Thiosarin probably belongs to the IVA compound series, leaving it much less volatile than sarin. It has a greater persistence in the environment than sarin.

Absorption frequencies of sarin derivatives showed that the frequency of stretching of the P-F and P=S bond of thiosarin is lower than that of its oxygenated analogue.

== CW history and candidate ==
Its toxicity was discovered in the 1970s by Friedrick Wilhelm Hoffmann and Ray King Irino. They were responsible for synthesizing and analyzing a series of sulfur G-agent compounds. The open literature reports that the compound has been cataloged as GS, but this statement is incorrect, it belongs to EA-1246. GBS is generally inferior than sarin. The little open military literature may be due to the low toxicity of this series of compounds and its high aquatic and environmental persistence.

The possibility of a chemical warfare agent candidate was raised when Bogomazov and his colleagues discovered that thiosarin had the ability to break through military gas mask filters, where it would then be converted to its analogue. An investigation by Vil Mirzayanov refuted these results.

Thiosarin has been investigated as a chemical warfare agent by Iraq.

Thiosarin is used as a precursor to sarin.

== Synthesis ==
The preparation route is quite similar to that of sarin. The synthesis routes of thiosarin are manifold.

Regardless of the synthesis route chosen, the final reaction is usually the reaction of isopropyl methylthiophosphonochloridate with fluorides.

== Reactions ==
Thiosarin has a tendency to convert to the all oxygen analogue by divers mechanisms.. In anhydrous medium, thiosarin is oxidized to form GB.

In the controlated aqueous medium, without the presence of oxygen, the tendency is to evolve hydrogen sulfide.

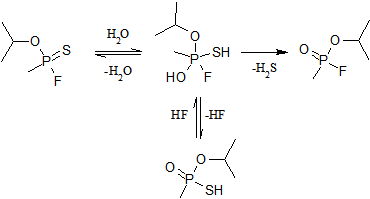

== Sarin-S ==
Along with the discovery of the high toxicity of this series of compounds, Hoffmann discovered that the S-alkyl isomers, unlike the alkyl alkylphosphonothiol compounds, were less toxic than the G(S) agents and less persistent than classic G-agents.
