= GS (nerve agent) =

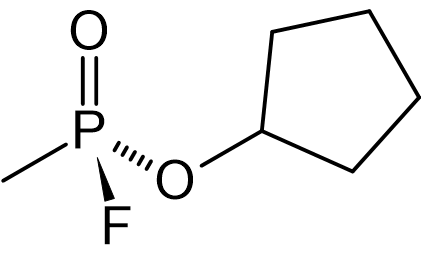

Names
- IUPAC name 2-[fluoro(methyl)phosphoryl]oxycyclopentane
- Other names Cyclopentyl methylphosphonofluoridate

Identifiers
CAS Number	7284-82-4
3D model (JSmol)	Interactive image
ChemSpider	493016
PubChem CID	567108
- InChI: InChI=1S/C6H12FO2P/c1-10(7,8)9-6-4-2-3-5-6/h6H,2-5H2,1H3 Key: JVMPZDDDTZJTKS-UHFFFAOYSA-N
- SMILES: P(C)(=O)(OC1CCCC1)F

Properties
Chemical formula	C_{6}H_{12}FO_{2}P
Molar mass	166.132 g·mol^{−1}
- Except where otherwise noted, data are given for materials in their standard state (at 25 °C [77 °F], 100 kPa). Infobox references

GS (IUPAC name: Cyclopentyl methylphosphonofluoridate), also known as G-agent S candidate No. 3 or EA-1246 (Edgewood Arsenal cryptonym), is an organophosphate nerve agent, part of a series of nerve agents "G-series". It is a potent acetylcholinesterase inhibitor with properties similar to other nerve agents. GS is structurally a derivative of the nerve agent sarin, being closely structurally related to GP. It is a derivative of its acyclic equivalent, 3-pentanyl methylphosphonofluoridate.

GS rapidly ages the acetylcholinesterase, exhibiting a rate approximately half that of soman and 60 times faster than its larger GF counterpart. GS was the third candidate in a series of 6 other organophosphonates, in which the vast majority are cycloalkyl/alkyl methylphosphonofluoridates, with the exception of GS-7, a derivative of the pesticide monitor.
