= Neuroepigenetics =

Field of study

Neuroepigenetics is the study of how epigenetic changes to genes affect the nervous system. These changes may effect underlying conditions such as addiction, cognition, and neurological development.

== Mechanisms ==
Neuroepigenetic mechanisms regulate gene expression in the neuron. Often, these changes take place due to recurring stimuli. Neuroepigenetic mechanisms involve proteins or protein pathways that regulate gene expression by adding, editing or reading epigenetic marks such as methylation or acetylation. Some of these mechanisms include ATP-dependent chromatin remodeling, LINE1, and prion protein-based modifications. Other silencing mechanisms include the recruitment of specialized proteins that methylate DNA such that the core promoter element is inaccessible to transcription factors and RNA polymerase. As a result, transcription is no longer possible. One such protein pathway is the REST co-repressor complex pathway. There are also several non-coding RNAs that regulate neural function at the epigenetic level. These mechanisms, along with neural histone methylation, affect arrangement of synapses, neuroplasticity, and play a key role in learning and memory.

=== Methylation ===
DNA methyltransferases (DNMTs) are involved in regulation of the electrophysiological landscape of the brain through methylation of CpGs. Several studies have shown that inhibition or depletion of DNMT1 activity during neural maturation leads to hypomethylation of the neurons by removing the cell's ability to maintain methylation marks in the chromatin. This gradual loss of methylation marks leads to changes in the expression of crucial developmental genes that may be dosage sensitive, leading to neural degeneration. This was observed in the mature neurons in the dorsal portion of the mouse prosencephalon, where there was significantly greater amounts of neural degeneration and poor neural signaling in the absence of DNMT1. Despite poor survival rates amongst the DNMT1-depleted neurons, some of the cells persisted throughout the lifespan of the organism. The surviving cells reaffirmed that the loss of DNMT1 led to hypomethylation in the neural cell genome. These cells also exhibited poor neural functioning. In fact, a global loss of neural functioning was also observed in these model organisms, with the greatest amounts neural degeneration occurring in the prosencephalon.

Other studies showed a trend for DNMT3a and DNMT3b. However, these DNMT's add new methyl marks on unmethylated DNA, unlike DNMT1. Like DNMT1, the loss of DNMT3a and 3b resulted in neuromuscular degeneration two months after birth, as well as poor survival rates amongst the progeny of the mutant cells, even though DNMT3a does not regularly function to maintain methylation marks. This conundrum was addressed by other studies which recorded rare loci in mature neurons where DNMT3a acted as a maintenance DNMT. The Gfap locus, which codes for the formation and regulation of the cytoskeleton of astrocytes, is one such locus where this activity is observed. The gene is regularly methylated to downregulate glioma related cancers. DNMT inhibition leads to decreased methylation and increased synaptic activity. Several studies show that the methylation-related increase or decrease in synaptic activity occurs due to the upregulation or downregulation of receptors at the neurological synapse. Such receptor regulation plays a major role in many important mechanisms, such as the 'fight or flight' response. The glucocorticoid receptor (GR) is the most studied of these receptors. During stressful circumstances, there is a signaling cascade that begins from the pituitary gland and terminates due to a negative feedback loop from the adrenal gland. In this loop, the increase in the levels of the stress response hormone results in the increase of GR. Increase in GR results in the decrease of cellular response to the hormone levels. It has been shown that methylation of the I7 exon within the GR locus leads to a lower level of basal GR expression in mice. These mice were more susceptible to high levels of stress as opposed to mice with lower levels of methylation at the I7 exon. Up-regulation or down-regulation of receptors through methylation leads to change in synaptic activity of the neuron.

=== Hypermethylation, CpG islands, and tumor suppressing genes ===
CpG Islands (CGIs) are regulatory elements that can influence gene expression by allowing or interfering with transcription initiation or enhancer activity. CGIs are generally interspersed with the promoter regions of the genes they affect and may also affect more than one promoter region. In addition they may also include enhancer elements and be separate from the transcription start site. Hypermethylation at key CGIs can effectively silence expression of tumor suppressing genes and is common in gliomas. Tumor suppressing genes are those which inhibit a cell's progression towards cancer. These genes are commonly associated with important functions which regulate cell-cycle events. For example, PI3K and p53 pathways are affected by CGI promoter hypermethylation, this includes the promoters of the genes CDKN2/p16, RB, PTEN, TP53 and p14ARF. Importantly, glioblastomas are known to have high frequency of methylation at CGIs/promoter sites. For example, Epithelial Membrane Protein 3 (EMP3) is a gene which is involved in cell proliferation as well as cellular interactions. It is also thought to function as a tumor suppressor, and in glioblastomas is shown to be silenced via hypermethylation. Furthermore, introduction of the gene into EMP3-silenced neuroblasts results in reduced colony formation as well as suppressed tumor growth. In contrast, hypermethylation of promoter sites can also inhibit activity of oncogenes and prevent tumorigenesis. Such oncogenic pathways as the transformation growth factor (TGF)-beta signaling pathway stimulate cells to proliferate. In glioblastomas the overactivity of this pathway is associated with aggressive forms of tumor growth. Hypermethylation of PDGF-B, the TGF-beta target, inhibits uncontrolled proliferation.

=== Hypomethylation and aberrant histone modification ===
Global reduction in methylation is implicated in tumorigenesis. More specifically, wide spread CpG demethylation, contributing to global hypomethylation, is known to cause genomic instability leading to development of tumors. An important effect of this DNA modification is its transcriptional activation of oncogenes. For example, expression of MAGEA1 enhanced by hypomethylation interferes with p53 function.

Aberrant patterns of histone modifications can also take place at specific loci and ultimately manipulate gene activity. In terms of CGI promoter sites, methylation and loss of acetylation occurs frequently at H3K9. Furthermore, H3K9 dimethylation and trimethylation are repressive marks which, along with bivalent differentially methylated domains, are hypothesized to make tumor suppressing genes more susceptible to silencing. Abnormal presence or lack of methylation in glioblastomas are strongly linked to genes which regulate apoptosis, DNA repair, cell proliferation, and tumor suppression. One of the best known examples of genes affected by aberrant methylation that contributes to formation of glioblastomas is MGMT, a gene involved in DNA repair which encodes the protein O6-methylguanine-DNA methyltransferase. Methylation of the MGMT promoter is an important predictor of the effectiveness of alkylating agents to target glioblastomas. Hypermethylation of the MGMT promoter causes transcriptional silencing and is found in several cancer types including glioma, lymphoma, breast cancer, prostate cancer, and retinoblastoma.

== Neuroplasticity ==
Neuroplasticity refers to the ability of the brain to undergo synaptic rearrangement as a response to recurring stimuli. Neurotrophin proteins play a major role in synaptic rearrangement, amongst other factors. Depletion of neurotrophin BDNF or BDNF signaling is one of the main factors in developing diseases such as Alzheimer's disease, Huntington's disease, and depression. Neuroplasticity can also occur as a consequence of targeted epigenetic modifications such as methylation and acetylation. Exposure to certain recurring stimuli leads to demethylation of particular loci and remethylation in a pattern that leads to a response to that particular stimulus. Like the histone readers, erasers and writers also modify histones by removing and adding modifying marks respectively. An eraser, neuroLSD1, is a modified version of the original Lysine Demethylase 1(LSD1) that exists only in neurons and assists with neuronal maturation. Although both versions of LSD1 share the same target, their expression patterns are vastly different and neuroLSD1 is a truncated version of LSD1. NeuroLSD1 increases the expression of immediate early genes (IEGs) involved in cell maturation. Recurring stimuli lead to differential expression of neuroLSD1, leading to rearrangement of loci. The eraser is also thought to play a major role in the learning of many complex behaviors and is way through which genes interact with the environment.

== Neurodegenerative diseases ==
=== Alzheimer's disease ===
Alzheimer's disease (AD) is a neurodegenerative disease known to progressively affect memory and incite cognitive degradation. Epigenetic modifications both globally and on specific candidate genes are thought to contribute to the etiology of this disease. Immunohistochemical analysis of post-mortem brain tissues across several studies have revealed global decreases in both 5-methylcytosine (5mC) and 5-hydroxymethylcytosine (5hmC) in AD patients compared with controls. However, conflicting evidence has shown elevated levels of these epigenetic markers in the same tissues. Furthermore, these modifications appear to be affected early on in tissues associated with the pathophysiology of AD. The presence of 5mC at the promoters of genes is generally associated with gene silencing. 5hmC, which is the oxidized product of 5mC, via ten-eleven-translocase (TET), is thought to be associated with activation of gene expression, though the mechanisms underlying this activation are not fully understood.

Regardless of variations in results of methylomic analysis across studies, it is known that the presence of 5hmC increases with differentiation and aging of cells in the brain. Furthermore, genes which have a high prevalence of 5hmC are also implicated in the pathology of other age related neurodegenerative diseases, and are key regulators of ion transport, neuronal development, and cell death. For example, over-expression of 5-Lipoxygenase (5-LOX), an enzyme which generates pro-inflammatory mediators from arachidonic acid, in AD brains is associated with high prevalence of 5hmC at the 5-LOX gene promoter region.

=== Amyotrophic Lateral Sclerosis ===
DNA modifications at different transcriptional sites have been shown to contribute to neurodegenerative diseases. These include harmful transcriptional alterations such as those found in motor neuron functionality associated with Amyotrophic Lateral Sclerosis (ALS). Degeneration of upper and lower motor neurons, which contributes to muscle atrophy in ALS patients, is linked to chromatin modifications among a group of key genes. One important site that is regulated by epigenetic events is the hexanucleotide repeat expansion in C9orf72 within the chromosome 9p21. Hypermethylation of the C9orf72 related CpG Islands is shown to be associated with repeat expansion in ALS affected tissues. Overall, silencing of the C9orf72 gene may result in haploinsufficiency, and may therefore influence the presentation of disease. The activity of chromatin modifiers is also linked to prevalence of ALS. DNMT3A is an important methylating agent and has been shown to be present throughout the central nervous systems of those with ALS. Furthermore, over-expression of this de novo methyl transferase is also implicated in cell death of motor-neuron analogs.

Mutations in the FUS gene, that encodes an RNA/DNA binding protein, are causally linked to ALS. ALS patients with such mutations have increased levels of DNA damage. The protein encoded by the FUS gene is employed in the DNA damage response. It is recruited to DNA double-strand breaks and catalyzes recombinational repair of such breaks. In response to DNA damage, the FUS protein also interacts with histone deacetylase I, a protein employed in epigenetic alteration of histones. This interaction is necessary for efficient DNA repair. These findings suggest that defects in epigenetic signalling and DNA repair contribute to the pathogenesis of ALS.

=== Neuro-oncology ===
A multitude of genetic and epigenetic changes in DNA profiles in brain cells are thought to be linked to tumorgenesis. These alterations, along with changes in protein functions, are shown to induce uncontrolled cell proliferation, expansion, and metastasis. While genetic events such as deletions, translocations, and amplification give rise to activation of oncogenes and deactivation of tumor suppressing genes, epigenetic changes silence or up-regulate these same genes through key chromatin modifications.

=== Neurotoxicity ===
Neurotoxicity refers to damage made to the central or peripheral nervous systems due to chemical, biological, or physical exposure to toxins. Neurotoxicity can occur at any age and its effects may be short-term or long-term, depending on the mechanism of action of the neurotoxin and degree of exposure.

Certain metals are considered essential due to their role in key biochemical and physiological pathways, while the remaining metals are characterized as being nonessential. Nonessential metals do not serve a purpose in any biological pathway and the presence and accumulation in the brain of most can lead to neurotoxicity. These nonessential metals, when found inside the body compete with essential metals for binding sites, upset antioxidant balance, and their accumulation in the brain can lead to harmful side effects, such as depression and intellectual disability. An increase in nonessential heavy metal concentrations in air, water and food sources, and household products has increased the risk of chronic exposure.

Acetylation, methylation and histone modification are some of the most common epigenetic markers. While these changes do not directly affect the DNA sequence, they are able to alter the accessibility to genetic components, such as the promoter or enhancer regions, necessary for gene expression. Studies have shown that long-term maternal exposure to lead (Pb) contributes to decreased methylation in areas of the fetal epigenome, for example the interspaced repetitive sequences (IRSs) Alu1 and LINE-1. The hypomethylation of these IRSs has been linked to increased risk for cancers and autoimmune diseases later in life. Additionally, studies have found a relationship between chronic prenatal Pb exposure and neurological diseases, such as Alzheimer's and schizophrenia, as well as developmental issues. Furthermore, the acetylation and methylation changes induced by overexposure to lead result in decreased neurogenesis and neuron differentiation ability, and consequently interfere with early brain development.

Overexposure to essential metals can also have detrimental consequences on the epigenome. For example, when manganese, a metal normally used by the body as a cofactor, is present at high concentrations in the blood it can negatively affect the central nervous system. Studies have shown that accumulation of manganese leads to dopaminergic cell death and consequently plays a role in the onset of Parkinson's disease (PD). A hallmark of Parkinson's disease is the accumulation of α-Synuclein in the brain. Increased exposure to manganese leads to the downregulation of protein kinase C delta (PKCδ) through decreased acetylation and results in the misfolding of the α-Synuclein protein that allows aggregation and triggers apoptosis of dopaminergic cells.

== Research ==
The field has only recently seen a growth in interest, as well as in research, due to technological advancements that facilitate better resolution of the minute modifications made to DNA. However, even with the significant advances in technology, studying the biology of neurological phenomena, such as cognition and addiction, comes with its own set of challenges. Biological study of cognitive processes, especially with humans, has many ethical caveats. Some procedures, such as brain biopsies of people with Rett syndrome, usually call for a fresh tissue sample that can only be extricated from the brain of deceased individual. In such cases, the researchers have no control over the age of brain tissue sample, thereby limiting research options. In case of addiction to substances such as alcohol, researchers utilize mouse models to mirror the human version of the disease. However, the mouse models are administered greater volumes of ethanol than humans normally consume in order to obtain more prominent phenotypes. Therefore, while the model organism and the tissue samples provide an accurate approximation of the biology of neurological phenomena, these approaches do not provide a complete and precise picture of the exact processes underlying a phenotype or a disease.

Neuroepigenetics had also remained underdeveloped due to the controversy surrounding the classification of genetic modifications in matured neurons as epigenetic phenomena. This discussion arises due to the fact that neurons do not undergo mitosis after maturation, yet the conventional definition of epigenetic phenomena emphasizes heritable changes passed on from parent to offspring. However, various histone modifications are placed by epigenetic modifiers such as DNA methyltransferases (DNMT) in neurons and these marks regulate gene expression throughout the life span of the neuron. The modifications heavily influence gene expression and arrangement of synapses within the brain. Finally, although not inherited, most of these marks are maintained throughout the life of the cell once they are placed on chromatin.
