= Epigenetics and melanoma =

Form of cancer

Melanoma is a rare but aggressive malignant cancer that originates from melanocytes. These melanocytes are cells found in the basal layer of the epidermis that produce melanin under the control of melanocyte-stimulating hormone. Despite the fact that melanoma represents only a small number of all skin cancers, it is the cause of more than 50% of cancer-related deaths. The high metastatic qualities and death rate, and also its prevalence among people of younger ages have caused melanoma to become a highly researched malignant cancer. Epigenetic modifications are suspected to influence the emergence of many types of cancer-related diseases, and are also suspected to have a role in the development of melanoma.

In the last few years, chemical alterations in the genome have become more evident, and these alterations can be critical in the development of malignancy. This alteration process is referred to as epigenetics Epigenetics is the term used to refer to stable changes in DNA that affect gene expression but do not involve changes in the underlying nucleotide sequence of the organism. The mechanisms by which epigenetics occur involve hypo- and hypermethylation of DNA, histone modifications by acetylation, methylation, and phosphorylation, and posttranslational modifications which include RNA silencing. These modifications can cause different expression patterns to occur, which can result in alterations to cells. Some of these alterations could result in the formation of cancerous cells or various other dangerous changes in cell function, among many other outcomes when paired together. Cancerous cells are not formed from just one change.

== Role of cytosine methylation in melanoma ==
In epigenetic alterations in cancer, DNA methylation is the most studied, although it is not the only alteration that can occur. DNA methylation is a covalent modification of DNA where a methyl group is added to the C-5 position of cytosine by DNA-methyltransferases. This occurs mostly at the cytosine-phosphate-guanine dinucleotide rich regions, known as CpG islands, and are located particularly in the promoter regions of genes in the human genome. These promoter regions are methylated in certain ways or can be completely unmethylated. However, in an altered methylation of the CpG islands (generally where the methylation pattern is inverted), transcription can be altered which can lead to cancer. This is due to chromosomes being highly condensed, preventing RNA polymerase and other transcription factors from recognizing and binding to the DNA. This can result in gene silencing. This silencing of genes can be dangerous to cells, especially when the genes silenced are active in maintaining the cell cycle. The table below shows some of the important genes targeted by promoter hypermethylation in melanoma.

TABLE 1. Various genes targeted by promoter hypermethylation in melanoma

| Gene | Frequency of alteration within Melanoma (%) |
|---|---|
| RASSF1A | 36–57 |
| APC | 19 |
| PYCARD | 50 |
| RARB | 20–70 |
| MGMT | 0–34 |
| DAPK | 19 |
| 3–OST- 2 | 56 |
| CDKN1B | 0–9 |
| INK4A | 10–20 |
| HOXB13 | 20–33 |
| SYK | 30–89 |
| PRDX2 | 8 |
| PTEN | 0–62 |

Some of the genes affected by cytosine methylation in melanoma formation

INK4A

INK4A, also known as p16, is a tumor suppressor gene and is found to have hypermethylated promoter regions in 10–20% of melanoma cells and is involved in 40–87% of gene alterations in melanoma cases. This means that 10–20% of the time there is an epigenetic change in the INK4A gene, and 40–87% of the time there is a nucleotide mutation in the gene. INK4A is one of the genes that is both epigenetically and genomically altered. As a regularly functioning gene, INK4A is a tumor suppressor that functions to repress the formation of tumors. The hypermethylation of this gene can cause it to become inactivated. When INK4 is inactivated through hypermethylation, it causes an interruption of the CDK4 and CDK6 genes, which normally stop cell growth in the G1 phase of cell division. When this happens, there is no regulation in the cell and it grows quickly and becomes cancerous.

SYK

SYK is another gene that is affected by cytosine methylation during cancer progression. It is a gene that, when hypermethylated, loses function. This gene is found in 30–89% of melanoma cases, and causes cells to grow quickly. This fast growth is important in the quick metastasis of melanoma cells, and when hypermethylated, the growth and spread of cells slow considerably. This is a controversial finding with inconclusive results, though. Some findings show that normally functioning SYK genes aids in tumor suppression, while other studies find that it is a transforming factor that facilitates cancer formation. Normally functioning, the SYK gene produces a non- receptor protein kinase enzyme that aids in differentiation, proliferation, and phagocytosis among many other important processes. SYK is found expressed in a variety of cells including fibroblasts, epithelial cells (where it controls cell division and acts as a tumor suppressor), hepatocytes, and neuronal cells (TORCIS Bioscience, 2014). Although SYK does not have any reported DNA modifications, the epigenetic changes still cause sufficient damage to cells. When SYK silencing is coupled with other alterations, both genetically and epigenetically, cancer can form.

== Role of histone modification in melanoma ==
Histone modifications play a large role in epigenetics because of their widely varied methods of occurrence and affect. Modifications to histones come about in many forms, with many still not being clearly understood. Methylation, acetylation, phosphorylation, and ubiquitination are the main categories of histone modification, with combinations of changes resulting in a range of genetic expression.

Histone methylation generally causes genes to turn off. Methylation of histones is also important for maintaining heterochromatin boundaries and a misregulation can lead to over expression or under expression of genes. This over expression or under expression can lead to the formation of cancer cells within an organism. On the other end of the spectrum, demethylation causes genes to turn on. This activation can be just as detrimental to cells, as their processes are disrupted by unnecessary gene products. Most histone methylation occurs in the promoter region, and is similar to cytosine methylation in process and function.

Histone acetylation is generally associated with transcription activation, which can cause certain proteins to be coded for and expressed when they shouldn't be. This can potentially lead to cancer. Conversely, deacetylation of genes causes transcription to be inhibited, shutting down important biological processes within the cell. In melanoma, Ku70 and Ku86 genes involved in DNA repair, were found to be inactivated when a histone deacetylase, or HDAC, was exposed to the gene.

Histone phosphorylation is the process by which a phosphate group is added to histone tails. This process drastically changes histone structure and shape. It has been discovered that phosphorylation causes post translational changes, with binding domains having been found, in addition to regulations in DNA repair, transcription regulation, and chromatin condensation. One of the major phosphorylations in DNA repair is the H2AX location. When H2AX is phosphorylated, it spreads throughout the DNA break and is thought to recruit acetyltransferases to relax the DNA and allow repair proteins to access the damaged portion. Phosphorylation of histones begins the process of DNA repair, and it is important for signaling other processes to begin, including cell division . H2AX is an indicator of melanoma because of its high correlation to chromosomal instability. When high levels of H2AX are present, more phosphorylation occurs and chromosomes are more susceptible to damage. Histone phosphorylation of H3S10 has been shown to associate with H3 acetylation, which is integral in transcription activation. If transcription is altered, cells are generally negatively impacted and they react in adverse ways that may harm the organism.

== Roles microRNAs play in melanoma development ==
Scientists have wondered how melanoma cells travel from major tumors found on the surface of the skin to the liver, brain, lungs and other organs where they become very destructive, resistant to treatments and even cause death. Research being conducted tries to answer the question of how and why melanoma cells become defective and cause harm to people. Many studies have found that some classes of short strands of RNA, called microRNAs, are linked to these harmful properties of melanoma cells.

MicroRNAs (miRNAs) are non-coding RNAs of roughly 20–22 nucleotides in length. They function in post-transcriptional gene regulation, preventing a particular protein from being produced. They can do this in many ways, such as binding to and destroying the messenger RNA that otherwise would have produced the protein. MiRNAs have also been shown to bind directly to messenger RNA and silence them before they are able to be translated into proteins which would play important roles in transcription. There are roughly 1000 miRNAs in the human genome, and about 33% of all human messenger RNAs are under their control.

MiRNAs function in several areas of biological processes, including differentiation, proliferation and apoptosis. They have also been found to play important roles in the development of cancers. Some of these non-coding RNAs, including miRNA-205, have been linked, recently, to the over or under expression of several genes associated with cancer and other life-threatening diseases such as heart disease, and alterations in their expressions have been shown to impact cancer cell growth, survival and the ability to spread. For instance, the loss of the miRNA-205 expression is associated with the metastasis of melanoma. An overproduction of MiRNAs can cause the epigenetic silencing of many important genes such as MITF, FOXO3, TFAP2C, CCND1, ITGA3 and c-KIT, needed in cell cycle regulation, and this can cause a cell to become cancerous.

MicroRNAs and genes involved in melanoma

A particular miRNA, MiR-182, has been found to impact MITF and FOXO3, which are tumor suppressor genes. MiR-182 is a member of a miRNA cluster in a chromosomal locus that is most often amplified in melanoma. It is frequently up-regulated in human melanoma tissue samples and cell lines, and this up-regulation causes its ectopic expression, which stimulates migration of melanoma cells, both in vitro and in vivo. The down-regulation of this miRNA triggers apoptosis. Over-expression of miR-182 in malignancy has been shown to negatively impact these tumor suppressor genes by directly repressing them. The repression of these genes allows miRNA to promote the spread and migration of melanoma cells, not taking into account the properties necessary for metastasis to occur.

In an experiment by Penna et al. 2011 on miRNA-214, it was shown that the miRNA regulates the expression of a panel of 11 target genes, including TFAP2C and ITGA3, and contributes to melanoma tumor progression by suppressing those genes. In this experiment, these genes, known to contain one or more binding sites of the miRNA, were obtained and their three prime untranslated regions (3'UTRs) cloned into a vector. Luciferase assays were then performed in MA-2 and/or MC-1 cells transfected with the miRNA. It was reported that luciferase expression, which was driven by the 3'UTRs of integrin alpha 3 (ITGA3) or transcription factor AP-2 gamma (TFAP2C), was repressed significantly. The team then tried to assess whether the luciferase expression regulation seen in the ITGA3 and TFAP2C genes depended on the binding between the miRNA and the complementary sequence that was present on the 3'UTRs of either gene. A four nucleotide deletion or three point mutations were respectively inserted in the ITGA3 or TFAP2C 3'UTRs, and the 3'UTR alterations entirely abrogated the effect of the miRNA over-expression on luciferase expression in the MA-2 and MC-1 cells. This observation indicated the direct regulation of miRNA-214 on the 3'UTR binding sites of the ITGA3 and TFAP2C genes.

Further experiment on protein expression was also conducted on these two particular genes, TFAP2C and ITGA3, and it was shown that miRNA-214 over-expression led to a 30–90% protein decrease in ITGA3 and a 40–80% decrease in TFAP2C. Consistently, proteins were upregulated 20% in the ITGA3 and 40% in the TFAP2C when miRNA-214 was silenced in the MC-1 cell. This suggests that miRNA-214 importantly regulates the expression of the ITGA3 and TFAP2C genes and promotes melanoma tumor progression when overly expressed.

TABLE 2. Various genes altered by general mutations or amplification in melanoma

| Gene type | Gene Name | Alteration Type | Frequency of alteration within Melanoma (%) |
|---|---|---|---|
| Proto- oncogenes | NRAS | Mutation | 15–25 |
| | BRAF | Mutation | 50–70 |
| | KIT | Mutation | 2–10 |
| | CDK4 | Mutation, amplification | 0–9 |
| | CTNNB1 | Mutation | 2–23 |
| | MITF | Amplification | 10–16 |
| | CCND1 | Amplification | 6–44 |
| | PIK3CA | Mutation | <5 |
| | AKT3 | Amplification | 40–60 |
| Tumor Suppressor Genes | INK4A | Mutation | 40–87 |
| | ARF | Mutation | 40–70 |
| | PTEN | Mutation | 5–40 |
| | TP53 | Mutation | 0–25 |

Many genes are altered genetically and epigenetically in cancers, which is one of the reasons cancer is so hard to combat. INK4A and PTEN are two genes that are in both Tables 1 and 2 above, as they are both epigenetically and genetically mutated in melanoma cases. This is not uncommon, as cells need multiple changes to the genome to initiate a change as large as cancer. The epigenetic side of cancer research is growing and uncovering many overlaps like in the cases of INK4A and PTEN, giving a larger, more accurate image of cancer and melanoma. The complexity and variability of cancer epigenetics makes this a growing and important field. Since epigenetic modifications are able to be reversed, this makes them a target for therapeutics and part of the future of cancer combat, and specifically melanoma, due to its deadliness and difficulty to catch. The genes listed above are only the beginning of a long list of available treatment areas that could potentially reverse or prevent melanoma if detected early.

== Sources ==
- Saha K, Hornyak TJ, Eckert RL (October 2013). "Epigenetic cancer prevention mechanisms in skin cancer". AAPS J. 15 (4): 1064–71. doi:10.1208/s12248-013-9513-3. PMC 3787232. PMID 23904153.
- Wan PT, Garnett MJ, Roe SM, Lee S, Niculescu-Duvaz D, Good VM, Jones CM, Marshall CJ, Springer CJ, Barford D, Marais R (March 2004). "Mechanism of activation of the RAF-ERK signaling pathway by oncogenic mutations of B-RAF". Cell. 116 (6): 855–67. doi:10.1016/s0092-8674(04)00215-6. PMID 15035987.
- Sumimoto H, Miyagishi M, Miyoshi H, Yamagata S, Shimizu A, Taira K, Kawakami Y (August 2004). "Inhibition of growth and invasive ability of melanoma by inactivation of mutated BRAF with lentivirus-mediated RNA interference". Oncogene. 23 (36): 6031–9. doi:10.1038/sj.onc.1207812. PMID 15208655.
- Eskandarpour M, Kiaii S, Zhu C, Castro J, Sakko AJ, Hansson J (May 2005). "Suppression of oncogenic NRAS by RNA interference induces apoptosis of human melanoma cells". Int J Cancer. 115 (1): 65–73. doi:10.1002/ijc.20873. PMID 15688405.
- Demunter A, Stas M, Degreef H, De Wolf-Peeters C, van den Oord JJ (December 2001). "Analysis of N- and K-ras mutations in the distinctive tumor progression phases of melanoma". J Invest Dermatol. 117 (6): 1483–9. doi:10.1046/j.0022-202x.2001.01601.x. PMID 11886512.
- Stahl JM, Sharma A, Cheung M, Zimmerman M, Cheng JQ, Bosenberg MW, Kester M, Sandirasegarane L, Robertson GP (October 2004). "Deregulated Akt3 activity promotes development of malignant melanoma". Cancer Res. 64 (19): 7002–10. doi:10.1158/0008-5472.CAN-04-1399. PMID 15466193.
- Rothhammer T, Bosserhoff AK (April 2007). "Epigenetic events in malignant melanoma". Pigment Cell Res. 20 (2): 92–111. doi:10.1111/j.1600-0749.2007.00367.x. PMID 17371436.
