= Mir-196 microRNA precursor family =

mir-196 microRNA precursor family
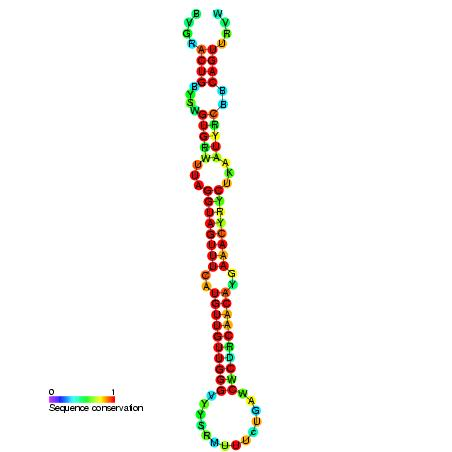
- Predicted secondary structure and sequence conservation of mir-196

Identifiers
- Symbol: mir-196
- Rfam: RF00256
- miRBase: MI0000238
- miRBase family: MIPF0000031

Other data
- RNA type: Gene; miRNA
- Domain: Eukaryota
- GO: GO:0035195 GO:0035068
- SO: SO:0001244
- PDB structures: PDBe

miR-196 is a non-coding RNA called a microRNA that has been shown to be expressed in humans (MI0000238, MI0000279) and mice (MI0000552, MI0000553). miR-196 appears to be a vertebrate specific microRNA and has now been predicted or experimentally confirmed in a wide range of vertebrate species (MIPF0000031). In many species the miRNA appears to be expressed from intergenic regions in HOX gene clusters. The hairpin precursors are predicted based on base pairing and cross-species conservation—their extents are not known. In this case the mature sequence is excised from the 5' arm of the hairpin.

It has been suggested that a rare SNP (rs11614913) that overlaps hsa-mir-196a-2 has been found to be associated with non-small cell lung carcinoma.
