= Schradan =

Names
- Preferred IUPAC name Octamethyldiphosphoric tetraamide
- Other names OMPA, Octamethyl pyrophosphoramide

Identifiers
CAS Number	152-16-9
3D model (JSmol)	Interactive image
ChEBI	CHEBI:82148
ChemSpider	8685
ECHA InfoCard	100.005.275
EC Number	205-801-0
KEGG	C19015
PubChem CID	9037
RTECS number	UX5950000
UNII	D77OYM46S1
UN number	3018
CompTox Dashboard (EPA)	DTXSID0042373
- InChI: InChI=1S/C8H24N4O3P2/c1-9(2)16(13,10(3)4)15-17(14,11(5)6)12(7)8/h1-8H3 Key: SZKKRCSOSQAJDE-UHFFFAOYSA-N
- SMILES: CN(C)P(=O)(N(C)C)OP(=O)(N(C)C)N(C)C

Properties
Chemical formula	C_{8}H_{24}N_{4}O_{3}P_{2}
Molar mass	286.253 g·mol^{−1}
Density	1.09

Hazards
- Occupational safety and health (OHS/OSH)
Main hazards	Toxic
- GHS labelling
Pictograms	(GHS06: Toxic) (GHS08: Health hazard)
Signal word	Danger
Hazard statements	H300, H310, H330, H371, H373, H412
Precautionary statements	P260, P262, P264, P270, P271, P273, P280, P284, P301+P310, P302+P350, P304+P340, P309+P311, P310, P314, P320, P321, P330, P361, P363, P403+P233, P405, P501
- Except where otherwise noted, data are given for materials in their standard state (at 25 °C [77 °F], 100 kPa). Infobox references

Schradan, named after Gerhard Schrader, is an obsolete organophosphate insecticide. Schradan itself is a weak cholinesterase inhibitor and requires metabolic activation to become active.

== See also ==
- Dimefox
- Mipafox
