= Dimefox =

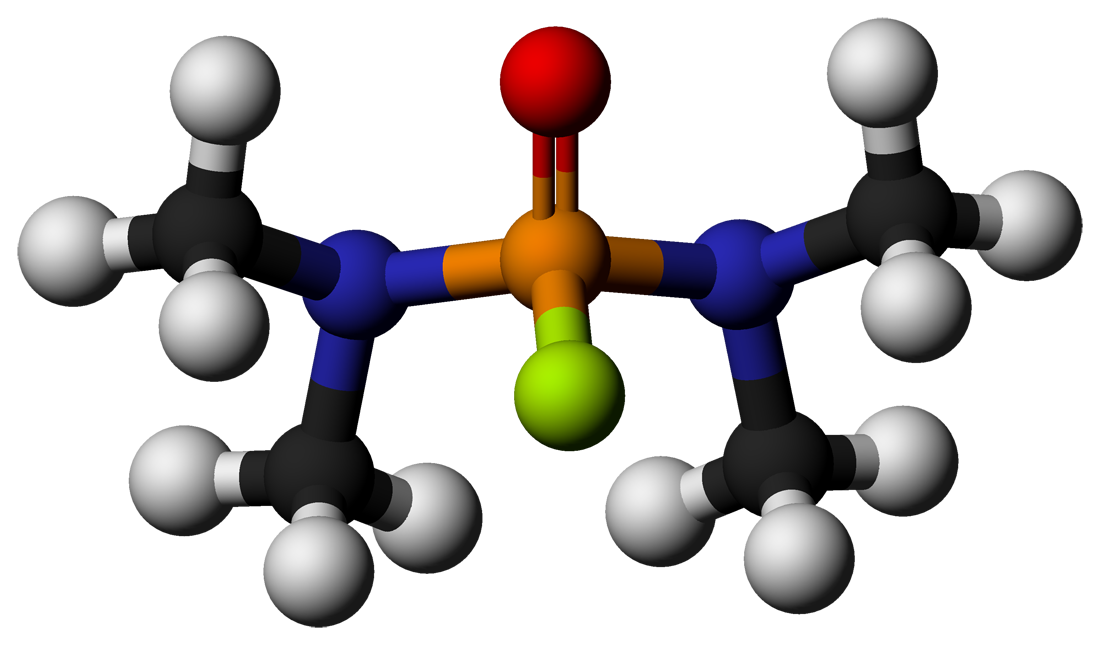

Names
- IUPAC name N-[dimethylamino(fluoro)phosphoryl]-N-methylmethanamine
- Other names TL-792; T-2002

Identifiers
| CAS Number | 115-26-4 |
| 3D model (JSmol) | Interactive image |
| ChEBI | CHEBI:82119 |
| ChemSpider | 7966 |
| ECHA InfoCard | 100.003.706 |
| EC Number | 204-076-8 |
| KEGG | C18980 |
| PubChem CID | 8264 |
| UNII | N8RU9F1IQD |
| CompTox Dashboard (EPA) | DTXSID8041870 |
- InChI: InChI=1S/C4H12FN2OP/c1-6(2)9(5,8)7(3)4/h1-4H3 Key: PGJBQBDNXAZHBP-UHFFFAOYSA-N; InChI=1/C4H12FN2OP/c1-6(2)9(5,8)7(3)4/h1-4H3 Key: PGJBQBDNXAZHBP-UHFFFAOYAM
- SMILES: CN(C)P(=O)(N(C)C)F

Properties
| Chemical formula | C_{4}H_{12}FN_{2}OP |
| Molar mass | 154.125 g·mol^{−1} |
| Appearance | colourless liquid |
| Density | 1.11 g·mL^{–1} |
| Solubility in water | 14.8 g·L^{–1} |
| Vapor pressure | 14663 mPa |
| Henry's law constant (k_{H}) | 2.28·10^{–8} atm·m^{3}·mol^{–1} |

Pharmacology
| Routes of administration | inhalation and dermal contact |
| Legal status | UK: Banned; US: Banned |

Hazards
- Occupational safety and health (OHS/OSH)
| Main hazards | Highly Toxic |
- GHS labelling
| Pictograms | (GHS06: Toxic) |
| Signal word | Danger |
| Hazard statements | H300, H310 |
| Precautionary statements | P262, P264, P270, P280, P301+P310, P302+P350, P310, P321, P322, P330, P361, P363, P405, P501 |
- Lethal dose or concentration (LD, LC)
| LD_{50} (median dose) | 2 mg/kg (oral, mice); 1 mg/kg (oral, rats); 3 mg/kg (intravenous, rabbits) |
- Except where otherwise noted, data are given for materials in their standard state (at 25 °C [77 °F], 100 kPa). verify (what is ?) Infobox references

Dimefox, also known as TL-792 or T-2002, is a highly toxic organophosphate insecticide. In its pure form it is a colourless liquid with a fishy odour. Dimefox was first produced in 1940 by the group of Gerhard Schrader in Germany. It was historically used as a pesticide, but has been deemed obsolete or discontinued for use by the World Health Organization. It is not guaranteed that all commercial use of this compound ceased, but in most countries it is no longer registered for use as a pesticide. It is considered an extremely hazardous substance as defined by the United States Emergency Planning and Community Right-to-Know Act.

== See also ==
- Mipafox
- Schradan
