= Lunasin =

Peptide present in certain grains

Lunasin is a peptide found in soy and some cereal grains that, since 1996, has been the subject of research connected with cancer, cholesterol and cardiovascular disease and inflammation.

== Discovery ==
Lunasin is a peptide that can be found in soy, barley, wheat, and rye. It is also found in grains originating in the American continents, such as Amaranthus hypochondriacus. This polypeptide was originally isolated, purified, and sequenced from soybean seed in 1987. Although uncertain about the peptide's biological activity, the Japanese team of researchers described it as a 43-amino acid peptide, noting specifically the unusual poly (L-aspartic acid) sequence at the carboxyl terminus. Subsequent research by Alfredo Galvez in the laboratory of Ben de Lumen at the University of California–Berkeley identified the peptide as a subunit of the cotyledon-specific 2S albumin. The name of the protein was chosen from the Filipino word lunas, which means "cure".

Lunasin was patented as a biologic molecule in 1999 by de Lumen and Galvez.

== Medical research ==
The biological activity of lunasin was discovered by Galvez while working in the laboratory of de Lumen at UC Berkeley.

There has been much research interest in the biomedical aspects of lunasin but the high cost of synthesizing lunasin made experimentation difficult. This limitation has been overcome by the development of methods to isolate highly purified lunasin from soybean white flake, a byproduct of soybean processing. In laboratory and animal experiments lunasin has shown anti-carcinogenic activity that suggests it may have chemopreventive potential.

=== ALS treatment ===
In 2014, a local news program reported that a person with ALS named Mike McDuff had experienced dramatic improvements in speech, swallowing and limb strength while taking a supplement regimen containing lunasin. ALSUntangled investigated and was able to confirm that Mike McDuff had progressive muscular atrophy, a "lower motor neuron" form of ALS, and really did experience dramatic and objective improvements.

Since one possible explanation for these improvements was the use of lunasin, Dr. Richard Bedlack of the Duke ALS Clinic decided to perform a clinical trial. Fifty people with ALS were put on the exact Lunasin containing regimen that Mike McDuff had taken and were followed for a year. The trial finished in September 2017. Unfortunately, there was no evidence that lunasin slowed, stopped or reversed ALS in any of the trial participants. Gastrointestinal side effects were more common than expected in trial participants, including cases of constipation severe enough to warrant hospitalization. Bedlack concluded that lunasin was not a useful treatment for ALS and that Mike McDuff likely had some other explanation for his ALS reversal such as an ALS mimic syndrome or a genetic resistance to the disease.
