= Mipafox =

Names
- Preferred IUPAC name N,N′-Di(propan-2-yl)phosphorodiamidic fluoride
- Other names Bis(isopropylamino)fluorophosphine oxide; Isopestox

Identifiers
CAS Number	371-86-8
3D model (JSmol)	Interactive image
ChEBI	CHEBI:82142
ChemSpider	9355
ECHA InfoCard	100.006.130
EC Number	206-742-3
KEGG	C19008
PubChem CID	9738
UNII	24MJP5H3YN
CompTox Dashboard (EPA)	DTXSID5042160
- InChI: InChI=1S/C6H16FN2OP/c1-5(2)8-11(7,10)9-6(3)4/h5-6H,1-4H3,(H2,8,9,10) Key: UOSHUBFBCPGQAY-UHFFFAOYSA-N
- SMILES: CC(C)NP(=O)(NC(C)C)F

Properties
Chemical formula	C_{6}H_{16}FN_{2}OP
Molar mass	182.179 g·mol^{−1}
Density	1.2
Melting point	65 °C (149 °F; 338 K)
Boiling point	125 °C (257 °F; 398 K)
Solubility in water	80 g/L

Hazards
- Occupational safety and health (OHS/OSH)
Main hazards	Highly toxic
- GHS labelling
Pictograms	(GHS06: Toxic) (GHS07: Exclamation mark)
Signal word	Danger
Hazard statements	H301, H370
Precautionary statements	P260, P264, P270, P301+P310, P307+P311, P321, P330, P405, P501
- Except where otherwise noted, data are given for materials in their standard state (at 25 °C [77 °F], 100 kPa). Infobox references

Mipafox is a highly toxic organophosphate insecticide that is an irreversible acetylcholinesterase inhibitor and is resistant to cholinesterase reactivators. It was developed in the 1950s and is now believed to be no longer in use.

== Toxicity ==
There are case reports of delayed neurotoxicity and paralysis due to acute exposure to mipafox.

== Synthesis ==
Phosphoryl chloride is first reacted with isopropylamine. The resulting product is then reacted with potassium fluoride or ammonium fluoride to produce mipafox.

== See also ==
- Dimefox
- Schradan
