= GP (nerve agent) =

Names
- IUPAC name 2-[fluoro(methyl)phosphoryl]oxy-1,1-dimethylcyclopentane
- Other names 2,2-Dimethylcyclopentyl methylphosphonofluoridate

Identifiers
CAS Number	453574-97-5
3D model (JSmol)	Interactive image
ChemSpider	28557503
PubChem CID	71447284
CompTox Dashboard (EPA)	DTXSID60855598
- InChI: InChI=1S/C8H16FO2P/c1-8(2)6-4-5-7(8)11-12(3,9)10/h7H,4-6H2,1-3H3 Key: WLHVXHBOEJKSJU-UHFFFAOYSA-N
- SMILES: CC1(CCCC1OP(=O)(C)F)C

Properties
Chemical formula	C_{8}H_{16}FO_{2}P
Molar mass	194.186 g·mol^{−1}
- Except where otherwise noted, data are given for materials in their standard state (at 25 °C [77 °F], 100 kPa). Infobox references

GP is an organophosphate nerve agent of the G-series, with a relatively slow rate of hydrolysis, and thus high stability and persistence in the environment.

GP is 4 times less volatile than soman and 1.5 times more toxic.
