= Methamidophos =

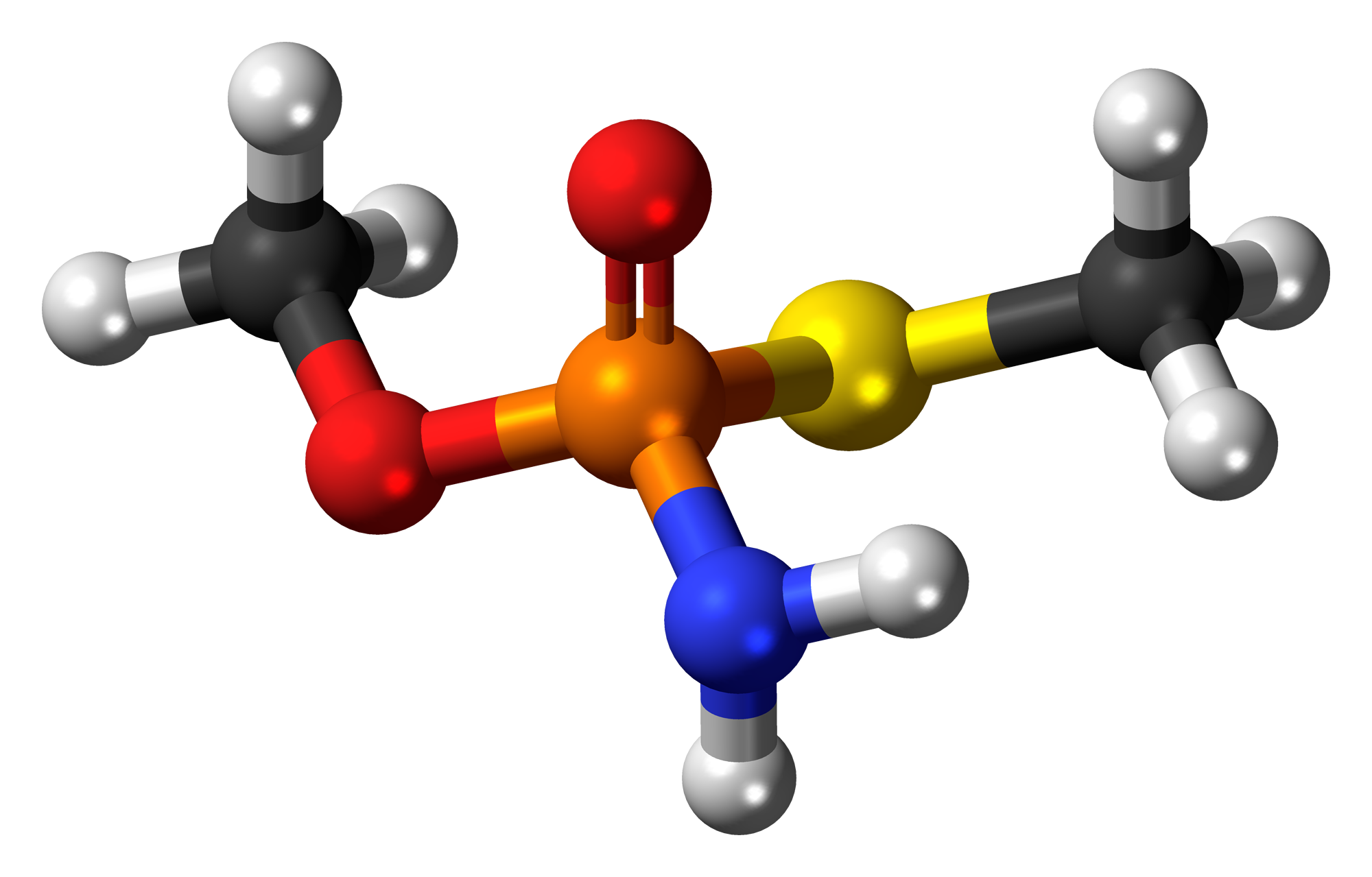

Names
- Preferred IUPAC name O,S-Dimethyl phosphoramidothioate

Identifiers
CAS Number	10265-92-6
3D model (JSmol)	Interactive image
Beilstein Reference	1098870
ChEBI	CHEBI:38721
ChEMBL	ChEMBL504888
ChemSpider	3954
ECHA InfoCard	100.030.538
EC Number	233-606-0
KEGG	C18667
PubChem CID	4096
RTECS number	TB4970000
UNII	8Z083FM94W
UN number	3018 2783
CompTox Dashboard (EPA)	DTXSID6024177
- InChI: InChI=1S/C2H8NO2PS/c1-5-6(3,4)7-2/h1-2H3,(H2,3,4) Key: NNKVPIKMPCQWCG-UHFFFAOYSA-N
- SMILES: O=P(OC)(SC)N

Properties
Chemical formula	C_{2}H_{8}NO_{2}PS
Molar mass	141.1 g/mol
Density	1.31 g/cm^{3}
Melting point	44.5 °C (112.1 °F; 317.6 K)
Boiling point	thermally unstable

Hazards
- GHS labelling
Pictograms	(GHS06: Toxic) (GHS09: Environmental hazard)
Signal word	Danger
Hazard statements	H300, H311, H330, H400
Precautionary statements	P260, P264, P270, P271, P273, P280, P284, P301+P310, P302+P352, P304+P340, P310, P312, P320, P321, P330, P361, P363, P391, P403+P233, P405, P501
- Except where otherwise noted, data are given for materials in their standard state (at 25 °C [77 °F], 100 kPa). verify (what is ?) Infobox references

Methamidophos, trade name "Monitor," is an organophosphate insecticide.

Crops grown with the use of methamidophos include potatoes and some Latin American rice. Many nations have used methamidophos on crops, including nations such as Spain, United States, Japan, and Australia. Due to its toxicity, the use of pesticides that contain methamidophos is currently being phased out in Brazil. In 2009, all uses in the United States were voluntarily canceled.

== History ==
Bayer and Chevron patented methamidophos in the late 1960's. Chevron introduced methamidophos as an insecticide and acaricide under the trade name Monitor in the United States in 1969, and by Bayer in Europe under the name Tamaron.

== Toxicity ==
LD_{50} rates of 21 and 16 mg/kg for male and female rats, respectively. 10–30 mg/kg in rabbits, and dermal LD50 of 50 mg/kg in rats. It is rapidly absorbed through the stomach, lungs, and skin in humans, and eliminated primarily through urine. It is a cholinesterase inhibitor.

Breakdown in soil is 6.1 days in sand, 309 days in water at pH 5.0, 27 days at pH 7.0, and 3 days at pH 9.0. Sunlight accelerates breakdown. It is uptaken through roots and leaves of plants.

It is classified as a WHO Toxicity Class "Class 1b, Highly Hazardous", and its parent chemical, acephate, is "class III, Slightly Hazardous".

== Use ==
Methamidophos is used in great quantities in ricefields in China. Rice–fish culture is common in the southern parts of China as well as in many other rice-producing countries (e.g., Thailand, Malaysia, and the Philippines). Brown rice (unpolished) in this study contained double the concentration of polished rice. Both plants and animals did not degrade the pesticide well, and fish for human consumption in these cases contains methamidophos in concentrations roughly similar to brown rice.

== Consumer Toxicity ==
Its toxicological effects are primarily associated with inhibition of acetylcholinesterase, an enzyme essential for the regulation of the neurotransmitter acetylcholine. Excessive acetylcholine accumulation can result in cholinergic syndrome, characterized by symptoms such as excessive salivation, sweating, nausea, vomiting, abdominal cramping, respiratory distress, muscle weakness, and, in severe cases, convulsions, respiratory failure, or death.

Consumer exposure may occur through improper handling, accidental ingestion, or contact with contaminated food, water, or surfaces. Due to its high acute toxicity and potential for harmful exposure, methamidophos has been subject to strict regulatory controls and restrictions in many jurisdictions, including limitations or prohibitions on agricultural and consumer use. Residue monitoring and safety regulations have been implemented in various regions to reduce the risk of dietary and environmental exposure.

The compound’s toxicity has led regulatory agencies to classify methamidophos as a highly hazardous pesticide. Appropriate protective measures, including controlled application practices and adherence to established safety standards, are considered necessary wherever its use is permitted.

== See also ==
- GS-7
