= Mir-15 microRNA precursor family =

Precursor microRNA family

mir-15 microRNA precursor family
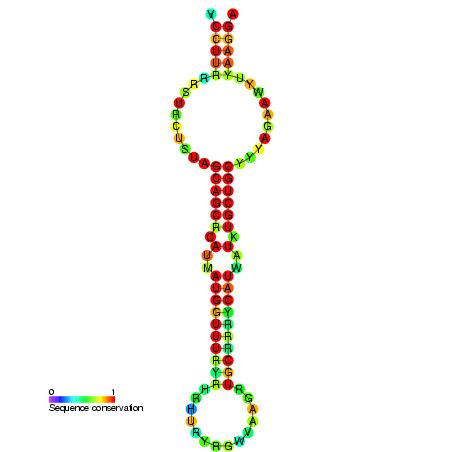
- Predicted secondary structure and sequence conservation of mir-15

Identifiers
- Symbol: mir-15
- Rfam: RF00455
- miRBase: MI0000069
- miRBase family: MIPF0000006

Other data
- RNA type: Gene; miRNA
- Domain: Eukaryota
- GO: GO:0035195 GO:0035068
- SO: SO:0001244
- PDB structures: PDBe

The miR-15 microRNA precursor family is made up of small non-coding RNA genes that regulate gene expression. The family includes the related mir-15a and mir-15b sequences, as well as miR-16-1, miR-16-2, miR-195 and miR-497. These six highly conserved miRNAs are clustered on three separate chromosomes. In humans miR-15a and miR-16 are clustered within 0.5 kilobases at chromosome position 13q14. This region has been found to be the most commonly affected in chronic lymphocytic leukaemia (CLL), with deletions of the entire region in more than half of cases. Both miR-15a and miR-16 are thus frequently deleted or down-regulated in CLL samples with 13q14 deletions; occurring in more than two thirds of CLL cases. The expression of miR-15a is associated with survival in triple negative breast cancer.

miR-15a/16-1 deletion has been shown to accelerate the proliferation of both human and mouse B-cells through modulation of the expression of genes controlling cell cycle progression. Studies have found the miR-15a/16-1 microRNA cluster to function as a tumour suppressor, with the oncogene BCL2 as its target. Specifically, miR-15a/16-1 downregulates BCL2 expression and is itself deleted or downregulated in tumour cells. There is a marked increase in BCL2 levels observed in advanced prostate tumour cases, which is inversely correlated with miR-15a/16-1 expression (and so corresponds to a decrease in miR-15a/16-1 levels). Inhibition of cell proliferation by the miR-15a/16-1 cluster occurs in both lymphoid and non-lymphoid tissue.

The miR-15a/16-1 cluster has further been found to be highly expressed in CD5+ cells, therefore hinting at an important role of miR-15/16 in normal CD5+ B-cell homeostasis.

== CHEK1 ==
The CHEK1 (checkpoint kinase 1) gene, located at chromosome position 11q24.2, is responsible for encoding the protein kinase Chk1. Chk1 in turn phosphorylates a phosphatase involved in cell cycle control. It mediates the cellular response to DNA replication errors, whilst also playing an important role in the prevention of genetic instability. Elevated CHEK1 levels have been found to be consistent with a lack of miR-15a/16-1 in mice. Postnatal induction of the miR-15 family has been shown to mediate the developmental inactivation of CHEK1 after birth. This inactivation has been identified as a possible contributing factor to the onset of cardiomyocyte binucleation during the neonatal period.

== Neonatal cardiomyocyte arrest ==
Postnatal heart development sees the upregulation of multiple miR-15 family members. In particular, miR-195, when found at higher levels than normal in the developing heart, has been identified as a factor that may cause heart abnormalities in newborns. This has been linked to premature cell cycle arrest, through impaired proliferation of heart muscle fibres and through repressed mitotic gene expression. An accumulation of cardiac muscle fibres sees a consequent block in the transition between the pre-mitotic/G2 phase and mitotic phase of the cell cycle, with postnatal inhibition of the miR-15 family inducing cardiac muscle fibres to enter mitosis. miR-195 overexpression is further associated with cellular hypertrophy.
