= TFAP2C =

Protein-coding gene in the species Homo sapiens

Identifiers
- Aliases: TFAP2C, AP2-GAMMA, ERF1, TFAP2G, hAP-2g, transcription factor AP-2 gamma
- External IDs: OMIM: 601602; MGI: 106032; GeneCards: TFAP2C

Gene location (Human)
| Chr. | Chromosome 20 (human) |
| Band | 20q13.31 | Start | 56,629,306 bp |
| Band | 20q13.31 | End | 56,639,283 bp |

Gene location (Mouse)
| Chr. | Chromosome 2 (mouse) |
| Band | 2|2 H3 | Start | 172,391,513 bp |
| Band | 2|2 H3 | End | 172,400,542 bp |
RNA expression pattern
| Bgee | Human / Mouse (ortholog); Top expressed in: ventricular zone; epithelium of lactiferous gland; lactiferous duct; skin of thigh; vulva; skin of hip; gingival epithelium; hair follicle; skin of arm; buccal mucosa cell / Top expressed in: conjunctival fornix; hair follicle; decidua; otic placode; gastrula; maxillary prominence; ventricular zone; primitive streak; condyle; lactiferous gland; More reference expression data |
| BioGPS | n/a |
Gene ontology
| Molecular function | DNA-binding transcription repressor activity, RNA polymerase II-specific; DNA-binding transcription activator activity, RNA polymerase II-specific; RNA polymerase II transcription regulatory region sequence-specific DNA binding; protein binding; protein dimerization activity; DNA binding; DNA-binding transcription factor activity; DNA-binding transcription factor activity, RNA polymerase II-specific; RNA polymerase II cis-regulatory region sequence-specific DNA binding |
| Cellular component | mitochondrion; nucleus; nucleoplasm; cytosol |
| Biological process | regulation of transcription by RNA polymerase II; cell-cell signaling; male gonad development; regulation of transcription, DNA-templated; regulation of cell population proliferation; regulation of gene expression, epigenetic; transcription, DNA-templated; transcription by RNA polymerase II; negative regulation of transcription by RNA polymerase II; positive regulation of transcription by RNA polymerase II |
Sources:Amigo / QuickGO
Orthologs
| Databases | NCBI: entry; OMA: entry |
| Species | Human | Mouse |
| Entrez | 7022 | 21420 |
| Ensembl | ENSG00000087510 | ENSMUSG00000028640 |
| UniProt | Q92754 | Q61312 |
| RefSeq (mRNA) | NM_003222 | NM_001159696; NM_009335 |
| RefSeq (protein) | NP_003213 | NP_001153168; NP_033361 |
| Location (UCSC) | Chr 20: 56.63 – 56.64 Mb | Chr 2: 172.39 – 172.4 Mb |
| PubMed search |
- Wikidata
| View/Edit Human | View/Edit Mouse |

Transcription factor AP-2 gamma also known as AP2-gamma is a protein that in humans is encoded by the TFAP2C gene. AP2-gamma is a member of the activating protein 2 family of transcription factors.

== Function ==
Transcription factor AP-2 gamma is involved in early development, specifically morphogenesis - the formation of shape. AP2-gamma can regulate gene transcription by interacting with viral and cellular enhancing components and binding to the sequence 5'-GCCNNNGGC-3’. AP2-gamma activates genes that are important for placenta development and retinoic acid-mediated differentiation of the eyes, face, body wall, limbs, and neural tube. AP2-gamma also suppresses genes such as MYC and C/EBP alpha. It also represses CD44 expression, which is a cell marker for some breast and prostate cancers. Mutations of this transcription factor can lead to poorly developed placenta and tissues.

A mutated AP2-gamma gene is known to cause branchiooculofacial syndrome (BOFS), which is a disease characterized by face and neck abnormalities, such as cleft lip or anophthalmia – lack of eyeballs, that have developed prior to birth.

Complete knockout of the TAP2C gene that encoded AP-2 gamma leads to placenta malformation and embryonic/fetal death.
