= EMP3 =

Protein-coding gene in the species Homo sapiens

Identifiers
- Aliases: EMP3, YMP, epithelial membrane protein 3
- External IDs: OMIM: 602335; MGI: 1098729; GeneCards: EMP3

Gene location (Human)
Chr.	Chromosome 19 (human)
Band	19q13.33	Start	48,321,509 bp
Band	19q13.33	End	48,330,553 bp

Gene location (Mouse)
Chr.	Chromosome 7 (mouse)
Band	7 B3|7 29.6 cM	Start	45,567,447 bp
Band	7 B3|7 29.6 cM	End	45,570,828 bp
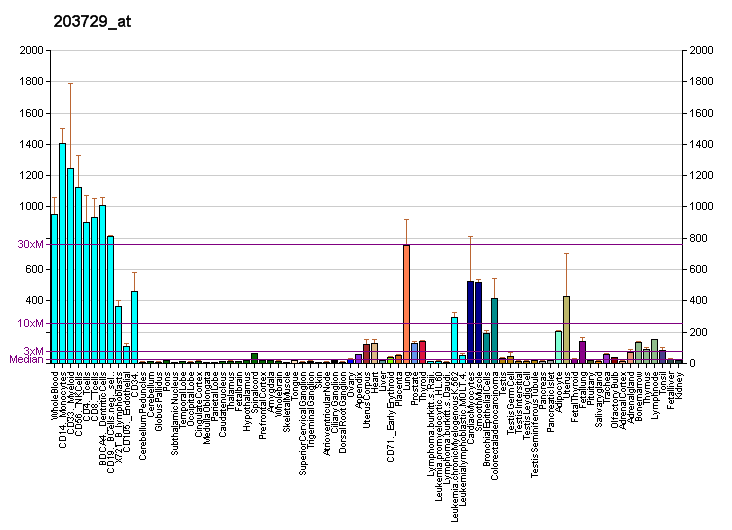
RNA expression pattern
Bgee	Human / Mouse (ortholog); Top expressed in: granulocyte; monocyte; synovial joint; stromal cell of endometrium; smooth muscle tissue; canal of the cervix; synovial membrane; body of uterus; right lung; left uterine tube / Top expressed in: calvaria; granulocyte; adrenal gland; ankle; external carotid artery; internal carotid artery; lip; umbilical cord; facial skeleton; efferent ductule; More reference expression data
BioGPS	More reference expression data
Gene ontology
Molecular function	protein binding
Cellular component	integral component of membrane; plasma membrane; membrane
Biological process	bleb assembly; cell death; negative regulation of cell population proliferation; cell growth
Sources:Amigo / QuickGO
Orthologs
Databases	NCBI: entry; OMA: entry
Species	Human	Mouse
Entrez	2014	13732
Ensembl	ENSG00000142227	ENSMUSG00000040212
UniProt	P54852	O35912
RefSeq (mRNA)	NM_001313905; NM_001425	NM_001146346; NM_010129
RefSeq (protein)	NP_001300834; NP_001416	NP_001139818; NP_034259
Location (UCSC)	Chr 19: 48.32 – 48.33 Mb	Chr 7: 45.57 – 45.57 Mb
PubMed search
- Wikidata
View/Edit Human	View/Edit Mouse

Epithelial membrane protein 3 (EMP3) is a trans-membrane signaling molecule that is encoded by the myelin-related gene EMP3. EMP3 is a member of the peripheral myelin protein gene family 22-kDa (PMP22), which is mainly responsible for the formation of the sheath of compact myelin. Although the detailed functions and mechanisms of EMP3 still remain unclear, it is suggested that EMP3 is possibly epigenetically linked to certain carcinomas.

== Structure ==
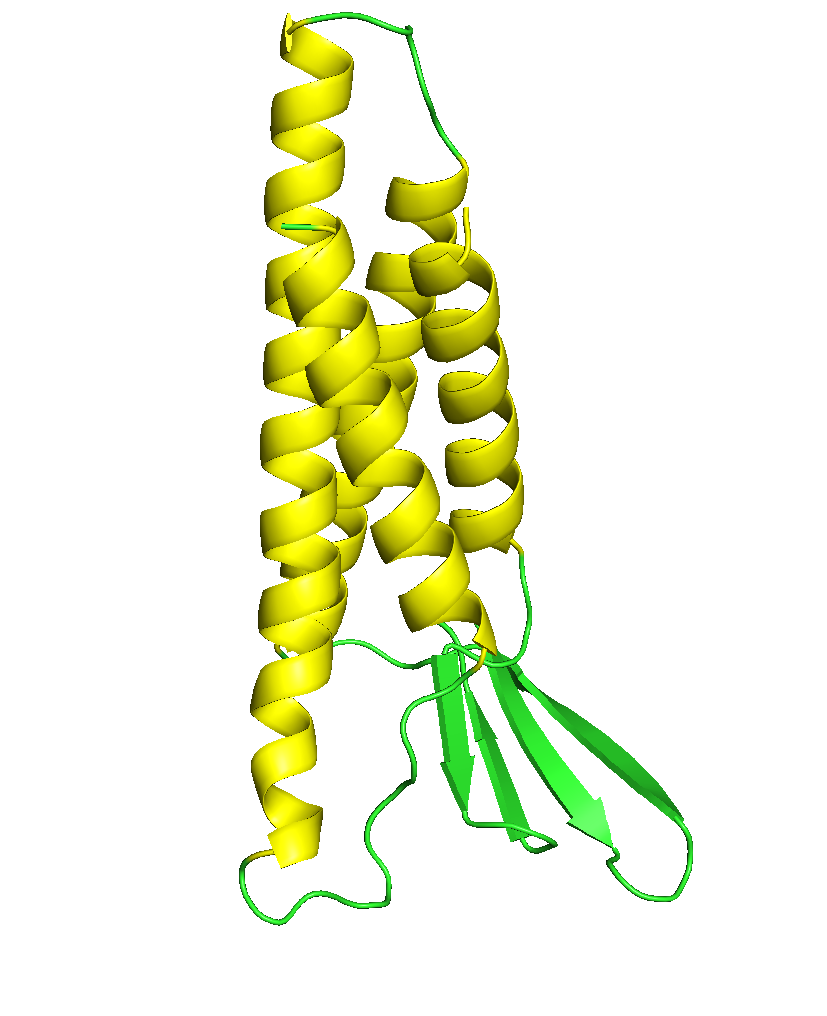
The EMP3 structure based on the 163-amino acid sequence. Four yellow helices represent four transmembrane domains.

EMP3 is a protein composed of a 163-amino acid sequence, which is expressed from its gene located on the band of the 19q13.3 in the Homo sapiens chromosome. EMP3 has the highest expression in the peripheral blood leukocytes compared to the expression in other body tissues. The protein is characterized by 4 transmembrane domains and two N-linked glycosylation sites in the first extracellular loop.

== Function ==
EMP3 is a transmembrane protein which participates in cell to cell interaction and cell proliferation. Overexpression and silencing of EMP3 both interrupt the normal expression of the EMP3 gene, which induces the progression (and formation) of cancers. Based on these properties of EMP3 and the prognostic analyses on several types of tumors and cancers, EMP3 has a tumor-suppressor-like role in regulating differentiation, apoptosis and development of cancer cells. However, the detailed mechanism still needs to be investigated.

=== Tumorgenesis and carcinogenesis ===
==== Primary breast carcinomas ====
The detailed functions as well as the mechanism of EMP3 in the development of various carcinomas have remained unclear. However, it was found that the levels of expression of EMP3 mRNA have a positive correlation in primary breast carcinomas. According to the study, EMP3 mRNA has a higher level of expression in the carcinoma compared to normal breast tissues. The overexpression of EMP3 has a significant correlation with histological grade III, lymph node metastasis, and strong Her-2 expression. Additionally, the hypermethylation on the promoter region of EMP3 has appeared in about 35% of the studies breast carcinoma cases. However, higher EMP3 expression levels occur in patients with both types of breast carcinomas, regardless of the promoter regions of EMP3 being hypermethylated or unmethylated.

==== Hepatocellular carcinoma (HCC) ====
Hepatocellular carcinoma (HCC), which is mainly caused by the chronic infections of hepatitis B virus and hepatitis C virus, become one of the major causes of cancer mortality worldwide in the recent years. EMP3 expression in HCC tumor cells has a higher expression level than that it does in normal tissues at similar regions of the liver. It was also found that the HCC patients who have a relatively lower histological grade inversely possess a higher level of expression in EMP3. Then, the researchers found that knockdown (gene silencing) of EMP3 resulted in reduction of cell proliferation and arrest of cell cycle, which suggests a potential role of EMP3 in tumor-suppressing.

==== Brain cancer ====
EMP3 is found to play a large role in the progression of neuroblastomas and glioblastomas, which are two of the most common types of brain cancers. Both have fast carcinogenesis result in a high rate of mortality. EMP3 is proposed as an oncogene whose overexpression in the progression correlated with glioblastoma (GBM). Reduction in EMP3 expression in CD44-high GBM cell lines promotes apoptosis of the cancer cell lines and disables potential tumorigenesis.

One of the signaling activation pathway involving EMP3 in the progression of glioblastoma was identified in 2016. The pathway was identified as TGF-β/Smad2/3 signaling, in which the unregulated TGF-β signaling promotes tumorigenesis in various human cells, especially CD44-high glioma cells. The interaction between EMP3 and the receptor of TGF-β regulate the TGF-β/Smad2/3 signaling activation, which eventually suppresses cell proliferation and weakens tumorigenesis in glioblastoma.

== Clinical significance ==
Due to the controversial effects of EMP3 on tumor suppression, the applicable treatments for certain carcinomas related to EMP3 are still unvalidated in humans. However, some animal experiments have shown a positive result on suppressing the tumorous tissues by modifying the EMP3 gene.
