= HELP assay =

For the purpose of DNA replication, the HpaII tiny fragment Enrichment by Ligation-mediated PCR Assay (HELP Assay) is one of several techniques used for determining whether DNA has been methylated. The technique can be adapted to examine DNA methylation within and around individual genes, or it can be expanded to examine methylation in an entire genome.

The technique relies upon the properties of two restriction enzymes: HpaII and MspI. The HELP assay compares representations generated by HpaII and by MspI digestion of the genome followed by ligation-mediated PCR. HpaII only digests 5'-CCGG-3' sites when the cytosine in the central CG dinucleotide is unmethylated, the HpaII representation is enriched for the hypomethylated fraction of the genome. The MspI representation is a control for copy number changes and PCR amplification difficulties.

It was recently shown that cytosine methylation patterns tend to be concordant over short (~1 kb) regions. The patterns represented by the HpaII sites therefore tend to be representative of other CG dinucleotides locally.

The analysis of HELP data involves quality analysis and normalization. An analytical pipeline written in the R programming language was recently published to allow HELP data processing.
