= MSPI (nerve agent) =

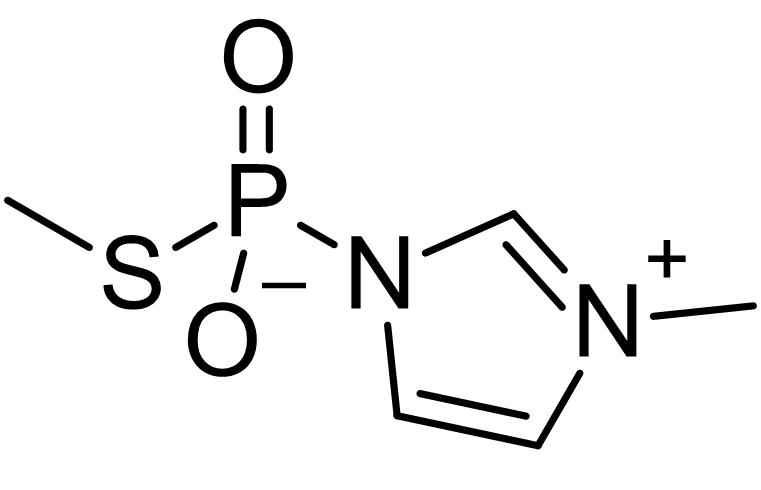

Names
- Other names MSMPID

Identifiers
CAS Number	70951-04-1
3D model (JSmol)	Interactive image
ChemSpider	46405
PubChem CID	51213
CompTox Dashboard (EPA)	DTXSID90221186
- InChI: InChI=1S/C5H9N2O2PS/c1-6-3-4-7(5-6)10(8,9)11-2/h3-5H,1-2H3 Key: QSLFDILMORXPKP-UHFFFAOYSA-N
- SMILES: C[N+]1=CN(C=C1)P(=O)([O-])SC

Properties
Chemical formula	C_{5}H_{9}N_{2}O_{2}PS
Molar mass	192.17 g·mol^{−1}

Hazards
- Lethal dose or concentration (LD, LC)
LD_{50} (median dose)	3.15 mg/kg (mice, subcutaneous)
- Except where otherwise noted, data are given for materials in their standard state (at 25 °C [77 °F], 100 kPa). Infobox references

MSPI is an irreversible acetylcholinesterase inhibitor. MSPI reacts with the acetylcholinesterase to form an aged enzyme adduct that can't be reactivated by cholinesterase reactivators.

== See also ==
- EA-2192
- Guanitoxin
