= Multistage =

Multistage may refer to:

- Armitage–Doll multistage model of carcinogenesis
- Multistage amplifiers
- Multistage centrifugal pump
- Multi-stage flash distillation
- Multistage interconnection networks
- Multistage rocket
- Multistage sampling
- Multistage testing
