= Kimmie Ng =

American physician

Kimmie Ng Kimmie Ng
- Occupation: Physician

Kimmie Ng is an American physician at Dana–Farber Cancer Institute who is known for her work on colorectal cancer in young patients.

== Education and career ==
Ng has an undergraduate degree from Yale University (1997) and earned her M.D. from the University of Pennsylvania in 2001. Subsequently she trained at the University of California, San Francisco and Dana–Farber Cancer Institute. In 2007, she received a masters in public health from Harvard University. As of 2021, Ng is a physician at the Dana–Farber Cancer Institute and a professor at Harvard Medical School. Ng is the director of Dana-Farber's Young-Onset Colorectal Cancer Center.

== Research ==
Ng is known for her work in gastrointestinal cancer, with a particular focus in addressing the rise in colorectal cancer in people under the age of fifty. In college, Ng focused on laboratory-based research in biochemistry. She shifted her focus to medicine where her research has shown increased survival in colorectal cancer patients following the consumption of vitamin D, research that has been widely covered by the media. She has also written about the survival rates in young patients with colorectal cancer. Ng has advocated for lowering the age of screening for colorectal cancer, and has spoken in multiple venues about the need to increase colorectal cancer screening for younger people. Ng also investigates the role of diet and microbiome in colorectal cancer, including one project that examined coffee intake by colorectal patients. Ng leads a 2021 research project that uses social media to connect with colorectal cancer patients. Ng has spoken about the impact of the COVID-19 pandemic on her personal life, and how the pandemic impacts treatment and diagnoses for cancer patients.

== Selected publications ==
- Bullman, Susan; Pedamallu, Chandra S.; Sicinska, Ewa; Clancy, Thomas E.; Zhang, Xiaoyang; Cai, Diana; Neuberg, Donna; Huang, Katherine; Guevara, Fatima; Nelson, Timothy; Chipashvili, Otari (2017-12-15). "Analysis of Fusobacterium persistence and antibiotic response in colorectal cancer". Science. 358 (6369): 1443–1448. Bibcode:2017Sci...358.1443B. doi:10.1126/science.aal5240. ISSN 0036-8075. PMC 5823247. PMID 29170280.
- Ng, Kimmie; Meyerhardt, Jeffrey A.; Wu, Kana; Feskanich, Diane; Hollis, Bruce W.; Giovannucci, Edward L.; Fuchs, Charles S. (2008-06-20). "Circulating 25-Hydroxyvitamin D Levels and Survival in Patients With Colorectal Cancer". Journal of Clinical Oncology. 26 (18): 2984–2991. doi:10.1200/JCO.2007.15.1027. ISSN 0732-183X. PMID 18565885.
- Ng, K; Wolpin, B M; Meyerhardt, J A; Wu, K; Chan, A T; Hollis, B W; Giovannucci, E L; Stampfer, M J; Willett, W C; Fuchs, C S (2009-09-15). "Prospective study of predictors of vitamin D status and survival in patients with colorectal cancer". British Journal of Cancer. 101 (6): 916–923. doi:10.1038/sj.bjc.6605262. ISSN 0007-0920. PMC 743349. PMID 19690551.
- Ng, Kimmie; Meyerhardt, Jeffrey A.; Chan, Andrew T.; Sato, Kaori; Chan, Jennifer A.; Niedzwiecki, Donna; Saltz, Leonard B.; Mayer, Robert J.; Benson, Al B.; Schaefer, Paul L.; Whittom, Renaud (2015). "Aspirin and COX-2 Inhibitor Use in Patients With Stage III Colon Cancer". JNCI: Journal of the National Cancer Institute. 107 (1): 345. doi:10.1093/jnci/dju345. ISSN 1460-2105. PMC 4271076. PMID 25432409.
- Ng, Kimmie; Nimeiri, Halla S.; McCleary, Nadine J.; Abrams, Thomas A.; Yurgelun, Matthew B.; Cleary, James M.; Rubinson, Douglas A.; Schrag, Deborah; Miksad, Rebecca; Bullock, Andrea J.; Allen, Jill (2019-04-09). "Effect of High-Dose vs Standard-Dose Vitamin D 3 Supplementation on Progression-Free Survival Among Patients With Advanced or Metastatic Colorectal Cancer: The SUNSHINE Randomized Clinical Trial". JAMA. 321 (14): 1370–1379. doi:10.1001/jama.2019.2402. ISSN 0098-7484. PMC 6459117. PMID 30964527.

== Awards and honors ==
In 2020, Ng received a young investigator award from Conquer Cancer, a foundation run by the American Society of Clinical Oncology.
