= Zosteriform metastasis =

- Specialty: Dermatology

Zosteriform metastasis is the spread of visceral carcinomas to the skin in dermatomal crops of succulent nodules.

== See also ==
- Alopecia neoplastica
- List of cutaneous conditions
