= Cancer selection =

Cancer selection can be viewed through the lens of natural selection. The animal host's body is the environment which applies the selective pressures upon cancer cells. The most fit cancer cells will have traits that will allow them to out compete other cancer cells which they are related to, but are genetically different from. This genetic diversity of cells within a tumor gives cancer an evolutionary advantage over the host's ability to inhibit and destroy tumors. Therefore, other selective pressures such as clinical treatments and pharmaceutical treatments are needed to help destroy the large amount of genetically diverse cancerous cells within a tumor. It is because of the high genetic diversity between cancer cells within a tumor that makes cancer a formidable foe for the survival of animal hosts. It has also been proposed that cancer selection is a selective force that has driven the evolution of animals. Therefore, cancer and animals have been paired as competitors in co-evolution throughout time.

== Natural selection ==
Evolution, which is driven by natural selection, is the cornerstone for nearly all branches of biology including cancer biology. In 1859, Charles Darwin's book On the Origin of Species was published, in which Darwin proposed his theory of evolution by means of natural selection. Natural selection is the force that drives changes in the phenotypes observed in populations over time, and is therefore responsible for the diversity amongst all living things. It is through the pressures applied by natural selection upon individuals that leads to evolutionary change over time. Natural selection is simply the selective pressures acting upon individuals within a population due to changes in their environment which picks the traits that are best fit for the selective change.

== Selection and cancer ==
These same observations that Darwin proposed for the diversity in phenotypes amongst all living things can also be applied to cancer biology to explain how selection drives change in the population of cells within a tumor over time. Therefore for the purpose of cancer evolution the body of the organism is the environment, and changes in the environment, whether via natural processes or clinical therapies, apply the selective pressures upon cancer that can drive a selective adaptation in cancerous tumor cells.

== Cancers as a product of host evolution ==
Cancer is a very ancient pathology that emerged with multicellular organisms. Hosts, therefore, have had billions of years to co-evolve with cancers. Over evolutionary time hosts develop an increasing number of cancer suppressors (e.g. cytotoxic lymphocytes, Natural Killer cells, suppressor gene such as p53 copy number of those genes. Cancers are the outcome of cells that escape these evolved suppression mechanisms.

== Diversity is a selective advantage ==
Cancer is a disease which is highly diverse not only its pathology, but in the initiation and progression from non-cancerous tissue to malignant tumor tissue . Cancer is considered to be stochastic in nature, in that there are many variables and probabilities that contribute to how a cell or tissue progresses from a state of non-cancerous, to cancerous, and eventually to metastasis. Cancer differs from many other diseases due to the uniquely long lifespan of the disease which contributes to the diversity of cancer cells both within a tumor and between related tumors in a host.

== Tumor heterogeneity ==
As time passes cancerous tumors can progress in genetic diversity amongst clonal cells due to the ability to accumulate changes over time, until the tumor reaches homeostasis thus allowing for the spread of the disease throughout the body of a host. Overlap this pathway with all of the other developmental pathways and possible events that can lead to the same outcome of metastasis, and it becomes apparent that cancer has a unique ability to find a way to progress into its cancerous phenotype. Therefore, from the moment of initiation putting cells or tissues down a pathway towards metastasis the majority of tumor cells will accumulate mutations that increases genetic diversity within the tumor (intra-tumor genetic heterogeneity). Not only can tumors be composed of genetically diverse cells, it can also lead to inter-tumor heterogeneity meaning that related tumors within the same host are genetically different. This tumor heterogeneity gives a selective advantage to the best fit clonal and sub-clonal cells of a tumor. Due to the heterogeneity and the unchecked proliferation of tumor cells, cancer is given a selective advantage not only over non-cancerous cells, but also against selective pressures that choose against it, such as pharmaceutical and clinical therapies, and also the host's immune system.

== Resistance ==
Due to its diverse nature, cancer has been able to evolve very defined and specific mechanisms to resist selective pressures. The goal of selective pressures upon cancer is to rid the disease of its diversity and thus in doing so forcing it back into an initial less harmful, more easily treatable, less diverse, non cancerous neoplastic state in which it is considered not to be lethal. A neoplastic state or neoplasm is simply an abnormal growth of tissue which can range from a harmless non-cancerous mole to a cancerous tumor. Cancer can circumvent negative selective pressures due to its ability to accumulate mutations that cause genetic diversity in tumor cells as the cells proliferate. Cancer seems to have evolved a propensity for, or at the very least, a selection for fitness. This is demonstrated in the ability for tumors which are undergoing large amounts of mutations to find a way for the cells composing the tumor to survive and to produce cellular offspring which are better fit for survival. Therefore, cancer initiation and progression have to be highly conserved evolutionarily or a tumor would dissociate merely due to inordinate volume of mutations that occur within it.

== Evolution in animals driven by cancer ==
Another interesting way to look at cancer evolution is not through the lens of how selective pressures shape the disease throughout its time spent within an organism, but rather to think of cancer as a selective force itself shaping the evolution of the populations of animal hosts. By taking this approach cancer selection would be defined in the same terms that natural selection and artificial selection are defined. This means that like natural and artificial selection, cancer selection would be defined as a selective force that is capable of driving population diversity and over time lead to evolution.

=== Cancer is selfish ===
Cancer is often defined as being selfish, in that it is composed of selfish cell lines which produce progeny that have higher fitness and reproductive success than parental cells which allow them to out compete other clonal cells. This increase in fitness (cancer progression) is of course detrimental to the host within which cancer resides. Therefore, one could possibly look at cancer and animal hosts to be intertwined in the complicated dance known to biologists as co-evolution. This theory would propose that as animals evolve new morphological traits and life-history behaviors they become more susceptible to developing cancer. Therefore, cancer gains the evolutionary advantage over animals because of newly evolved animal traits that it can select against or for its own survival. This then places the selective pressure back upon animal species to evolve or forever succumb to cancer selective pressures. Most recently it has been theorized that all of the morphological and life history diversity seen today in animals, is the result of the uncountable deaths caused by cancer in ancestral animal lineages.

=== Examples ===
Cancer is a disease with a long lifespan. Therefore, as animals evolved into bigger and more complex organisms with longer lifespans themselves their morphologies were highly restricted by the need to adapt a resistance to the negative selective pressures that cancer placed upon them. For cancer cells to thrive they must be able to proliferate unchecked and uncontrolled within the tissues of their animal hosts. Therefore, animals have adapted to cancer selection by evolving tumor suppressing genes. These genes help inhibit the initiation and progression of cancerous cells.
