= Alopecia neoplastica =

- Specialty: Dermatology

Alopecia neoplastica may present as a scarring alopecia, appearing anywhere on the scalp, and it has been described with cutaneous metastasis from breast, gastric, lung, renal and pancreatic carcinomas.

== Signs and symptoms ==
Alopecia neoplastica usually presents as a nodule, plaque, patch, or ulceration on the scalp.

== Causes ==
Alopecia neoplastica can come from tumors that are malignant or benign. The most common cancer linked to alopecia neoplastica was found to be GI cancer, followed by breast cancer.

== Epidemiology ==
According to one study, 53.7% of patients with alopecia neoplastica were women, compared to 46.3% of men. 59 was the median age at onset.

== See also ==
- Alopecia areata
- List of cutaneous conditions
