= Oncogenic retroviridae protein =

Oncogenic retroviridae proteins are retroviral proteins that have the ability to transform cells. They can induce sarcomas, leukaemias, lymphomas, and mammary carcinomas. These include the gag-onc fusion protein, rex, tax, v-fms, ras, v-myc, v-src, v-akt, v-cbl, v-crk, v-maf, v-abl, v-erbA, v-erbB, v-fos, v-mos, v-myb, v-raf, v-rel, and v-sis. The "v" prefix indicates viral genes which once originated as similarly named genes of the host species, but have since been altered through independent evolution as retroviral components. Not all retroviral proteins are oncogenic. The phrase was introduced as a MeSH term in 1990, under which over 6000 primary scientific publications are indexed.

== See also ==
- Oncogenic
