= Two-hit hypothesis =

Genetic theory of cancer formation

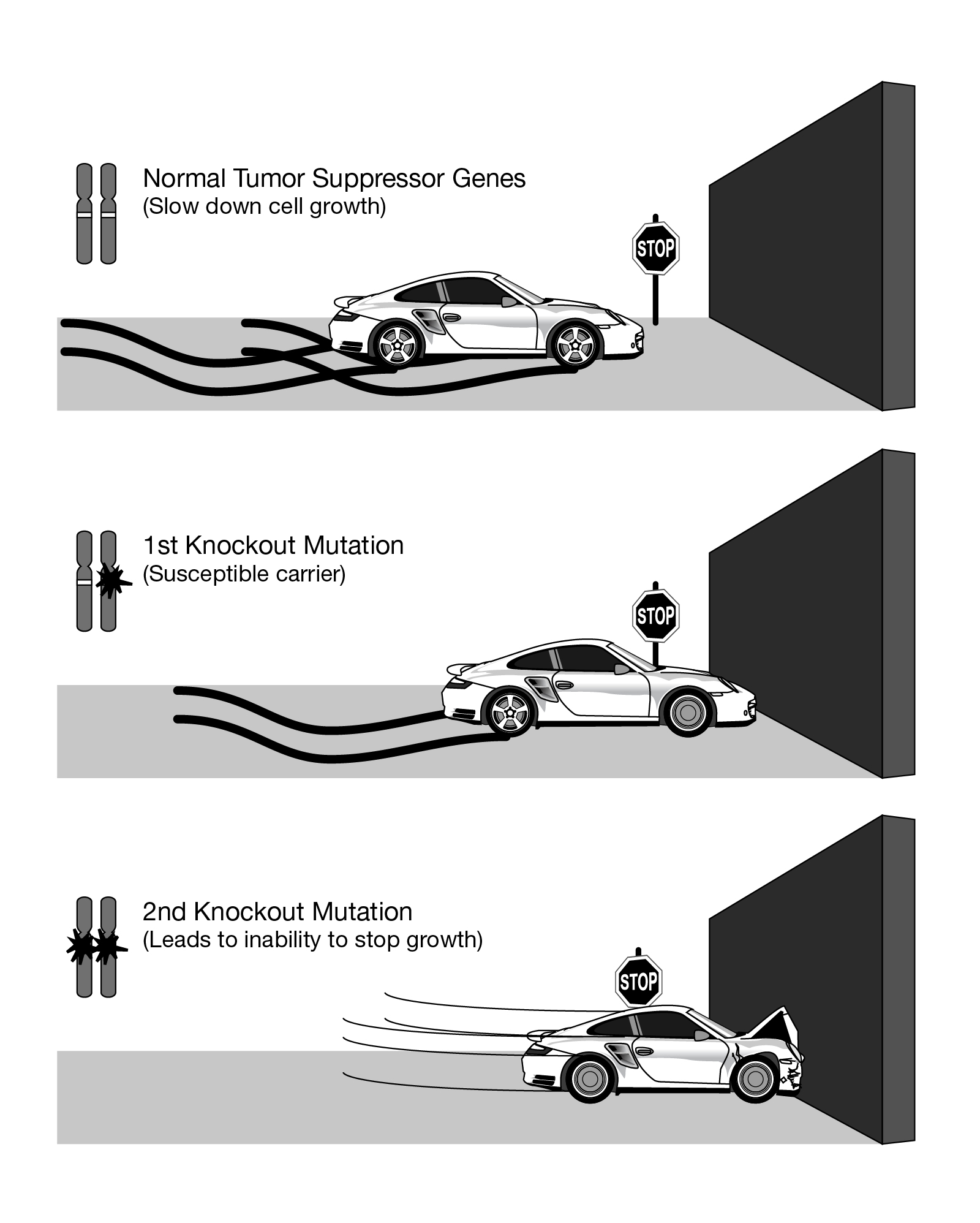
Analogical illustration of the results described by two-hit hypothesis

The two-hit hypothesis, also known as the Knudson hypothesis, is the hypothesis that most tumor suppressor genes require both alleles to be inactivated, either through mutations or through epigenetic silencing, to cause a phenotypic change. It was first formulated by Alfred G. Knudson in 1971 and led indirectly to the identification of tumor suppressor genes. Knudson won the 1998 Albert Lasker Clinical Medical Research Award for this work.

Knudson performed a statistical analysis on cases of retinoblastoma, a malignant tumor of the retina that occurs both as an inherited disease and sporadically. He noted that inherited retinoblastoma occurs at a younger age than the sporadic disease. In addition, the children with inherited retinoblastoma often developed the tumor in both eyes, suggesting an underlying predisposition.

Knudson suggested that two "hits" to DNA were necessary to cause the cancer. In the children with inherited retinoblastoma, the first mutation in what later came to be identified as the RB1 gene, was inherited, the second one acquired. In non-inherited retinoblastoma, instead two mutations, or "hits", had to take place before a tumor could develop, explaining the later onset.

It was later found that carcinogenesis (the development of cancer) depended both on the mutation of proto-oncogenes (genes that stimulate cell proliferation) and on the inactivation of tumor suppressor genes, that keep proliferation in check. Knudson's hypothesis refers specifically, however, to the heterozygosity of tumor suppressor genes. An inactivation of both alleles is required, as a single functional tumor suppressor allele is usually sufficient. Some tumor suppressor genes have been found to be "dose-dependent" so that inhibition of one copy of the gene (either via genetic or epigenetic modification) may encourage a malignant phenotype, which is termed haploinsufficiency.

== Related ideas ==
Field cancerization may be an extended form of the Knudson hypothesis. This is the phenomenon of various primary tumors developing in one particular area of the body, suggesting that an earlier "hit" predisposed the whole area for cancer.

Announced in 2011, chromothripsis similarly involves multiple mutations, but asserts that they may all appear at once. This idea, affecting only 2–3% of cases of cancer, although up to 25% of bone cancers, involves the catastrophic shattering of a chromosome into tens or hundreds of pieces and then being patched back together incorrectly. This shattering, it is presumed, takes place when the chromosomes are compacted during normal cell division, but the trigger for the shattering is unknown. Under this model, cancer arises as the result of a single, isolated event, rather than the slow accumulation of multiple mutations.

The exact function of some tumor suppressor genes is not currently known (e.g. MEN1, WT1), but based on these genes following the Knudson "two-hit" hypothesis, they are strongly presumed to be suppressor genes.

== Applications to other diseases ==
The hypothesis has been applied to other diseases as well. On example is Non-Alcoholic Fatty Liver Disease (NAFLD). However, the application to NAFLD is considered in published medical research as obsolete as well to not have been determined. The hypothesis of "multiple hit" hypothesis is considered a more accurate depict the pathogenesis of NAFLD for those who are genetically predisposed to the disease.
