= Alfred G. Knudson =

American physician and geneticist (1922–2016)

Alfred Knudson
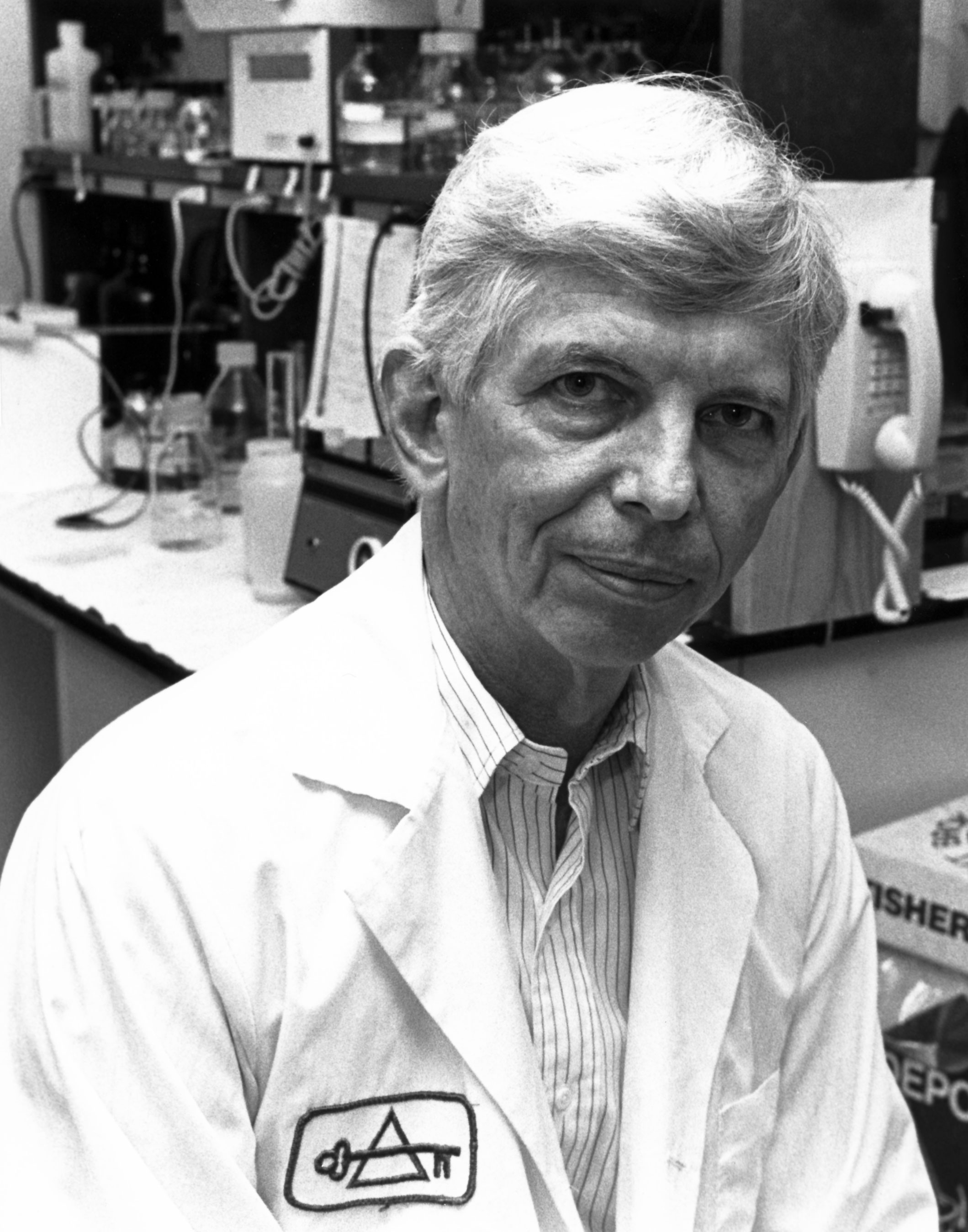
- Born: Alfred George Knudson, Jr. August 9, 1922; Los Angeles, California, U.S.
- Died: July 10, 2016 (aged 93); Philadelphia, Pennsylvania, U.S.
- Education: California Institute of Technology, Columbia University, California Institute of Technology
- Known for: Knudson hypothesis
- Awards: William Allan Award (1991); Lasker award (1998); Kyoto Prize (2004)
- Scientific career
- Fields: Genetics, Medicine
- Workplaces: Stony Brook School of Medicine, MD Anderson Cancer Center, Fox Chase Cancer Center
- Thesis: Histidine metabolism in liver (1956)
- Doctoral advisor: Henry Borsook

Alfred George Knudson, Jr. (August 9, 1922 – July 10, 2016) was an American physician and geneticist specializing in cancer genetics. Among his many contributions to the field was the formulation of the Knudson hypothesis in 1971, which explains the effects of mutation on carcinogenesis (the development of cancer).

== Early life and education ==
Knudson was born in Los Angeles, California in 1922. He received his B.S. from California Institute of Technology in 1944, his M.D. from Columbia University in 1947 and his Ph.D. from California Institute of Technology in 1956. He held a Guggenheim fellowship from 1953 to 1954.

== Career and research ==
After an initial faculty appointment at the City of Hope Medical Center in California, Knudson became the Associate Dean for Basic Sciences at the State University of New York at the Stony Brook School of Medicine. From 1970 to 1976, Knudson served as the Dean of Graduate School of Biomedical Sciences, University of Texas Health Science Center at Houston in the Texas Medical Center. He was affiliated with Fox Chase Cancer Center in Philadelphia from 1976 until his death in 2016.

Knudson is best known for his "two-hit hypothesis," explaining the incidence of hereditary cancers, such as retinoblastoma. Humans inherit two copies of every gene, one from each parent (except for genes on the X and Y chromosomes in males). Some people inherit one mutated version and one normal version of the retinoblastoma gene, which produces the retinoblastoma protein involved in controlling cell cycle progression. The inherited mutation is "the first hit." Over time, a mutation may arise in the normal version in one cell, thus producing "the second hit," which leaves the cell unable to control the process of cell division in an orderly manner, leading to cancer.

Knudson's insight was to compare the incidence of retinoblastomas, including the number of tumors, the ages of occurrence, and whether tumors occurred in both eyes, among children in families with and without hereditary predisposition to retinoblastomas. Children in families with a hereditary predisposition have more tumors at a younger age and usually have tumors in both eyes. Children in families without the hereditary predisposition usually have only one tumor at a later age.

The differences in occurrence can be explained by the rate of gene mutation during cell division (a somatic mutation), and a model that requires only one somatic mutation per tumor in hereditary cases but requires two somatic mutations, one on each copy of a particular cell cycle control gene, in one cell lineage in non-hereditary cases, i.e. the co-occurrence of two rare events. Knudson subsequently showed that the model was not only applicable to retinoblastoma but also to Wilms' tumors of the kidney. These studies led to the concept of tumor suppressor genes, which Knudson called "anti-oncogenes."

== Honors and awards ==
He received numerous prizes and honorary doctorates for his work, most prominently the 1998 Albert Lasker Award for Clinical Medical Research. He also received the 1999 American Society of Pediatric Hematology/Oncology (ASPHO) Distinguished Career Award, the 2005 American Association for Cancer Research (AACR) Award for Lifetime Achievement in Cancer Research, and the 2004 Kyoto Prize in Life sciences. He was a member of the National Academy of Sciences, the American Philosophical Society, and the American Academy of Arts and Sciences.

== Personal life ==
After a long illness, Knudson died on July 10, 2016, at the age of 93 at his home in Philadelphia . His wife of 40 years, Anna Meadows, was a distinguished pediatric oncologist (now retired) at the Children's Hospital of Philadelphia at the University of Pennsylvania.
