= Gastrointestinal cancer =

Organ system cancer located in gastrointestinal tract

- Specialty: Gastroenterology oncology
- Symptoms: upper Hematemesis Melena lower Coffee ground vomiting Hematochezia

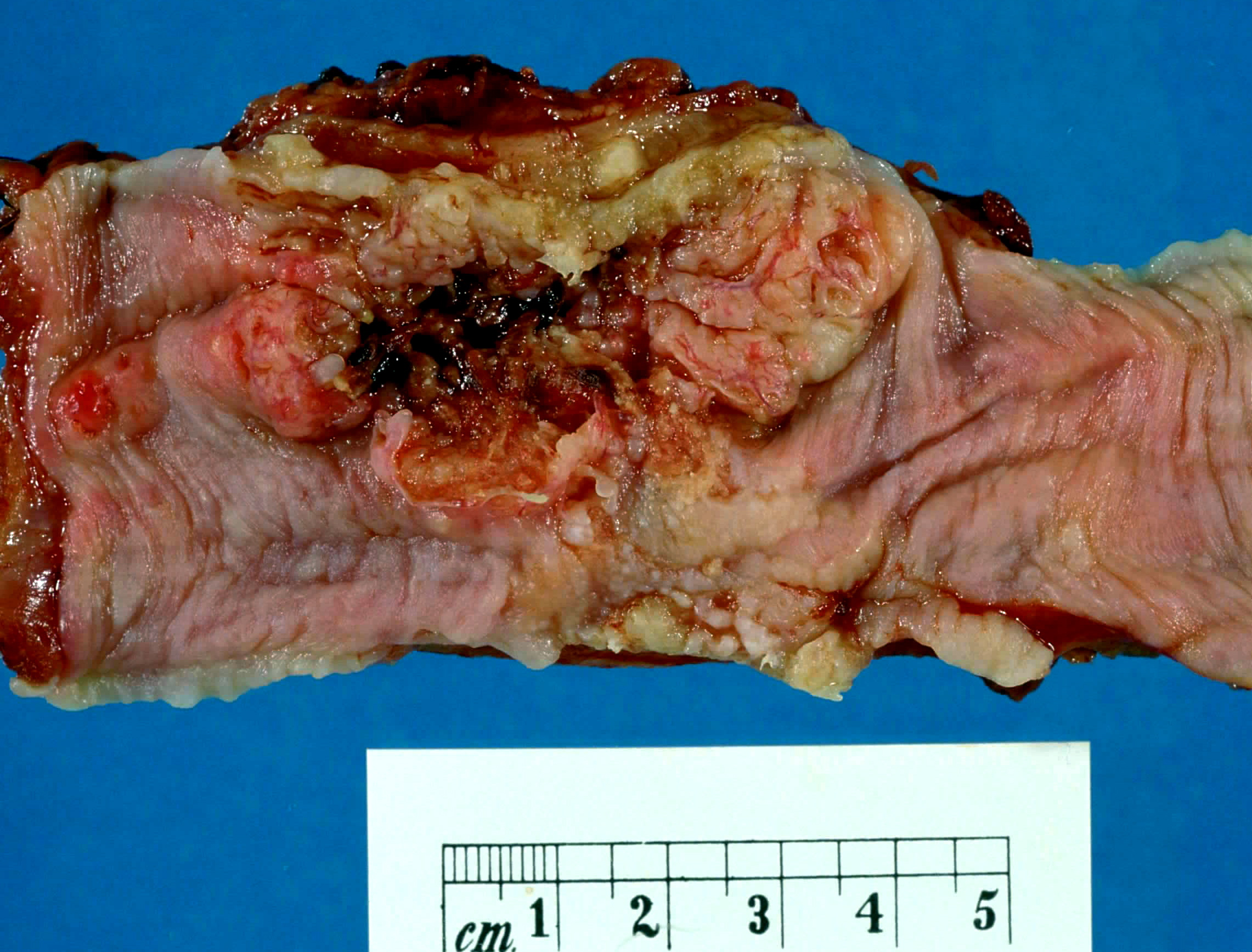
Squamous cell cancer, upper oesophagus.

Gastrointestinal cancer refers to malignant conditions of the gastrointestinal tract (GI tract) and accessory organs of digestion, including the esophagus, stomach, biliary system, pancreas, small intestine, large intestine, rectum and anus. The symptoms relate to the organ affected and can include obstruction (leading to difficulty swallowing or defecating), abnormal bleeding or other associated problems. The diagnosis often requires endoscopy, followed by biopsy of suspicious tissue. The treatment depends on the location of the tumor, as well as the type of cancer cell and whether it has invaded other tissues or spread elsewhere. These factors also determine the prognosis.

Overall, the GI tract and the accessory organs of digestion (pancreas, liver, gall bladder) are responsible for more cancers and more deaths from cancer than any other system in the body. There is significant geographic variation in the rates of different gastrointestinal cancers.

== Upper digestive tract ==
=== Esophageal cancer ===
Age-standardised death rates from esophageal cancer, as reported by the WHO in 2004.

Esophageal cancer is the sixth-most-common cancer in the world, and its incidence is increasing. Some three to five males are affected for each female. An "esophageal cancer belt", in which the incidence of esophageal squamous cell carcinoma (SCC) is more than a hundred times that of adjacent areas, extends from northeastern China through central Asia to northern Iran. Ethiopia also has a notably high incidence. There are two main types of esophageal cancer—adenocarcinoma and squamous cell carcinoma. Worldwide, the incidence of each type is about the same, but in developed countries like North America and Europe adenocarcinoma is the more common. Patients with esophageal/esophagogastric junction adenocarcinoma were found to have significantly greater number of DNA adducts (DNA damages) in the distal esophagus than in a control group.

Cancer of the esophagus is often detected late inasmuch as there are typically no early symptoms. Nevertheless, if the cancer is caught soon enough, patients can have a five-year survival rate of 90% or above. By the time esophageal cancer is usually detected, though, it might have spread beyond the esophageal wall, and the survival rate drops significantly. In China, the overall five-year survival rate for advanced esophageal cancer is about 20%, and in the United States it is about 15%.

=== Stomach cancer ===
Cancer of the stomach, also called gastric cancer, is the fourth-most-common type of cancer and the second-highest cause of cancer death globally. Eastern Asia (China, Japan, Korea, Mongolia) is a high-risk area for gastric cancer, and North America, Australia, New Zealand and western and northern Africa are areas with low risk. The most common type of gastric cancer is adenocarcinoma, which causes about 750,000 deaths each year. Important factors that may contribute to the development of gastric cancer include diet, smoking and alcohol consumption, genetic aspects (including a number of heritable syndromes) and infections (for example, Helicobacter pylori or Epstein-Barr virus) and pernicious anemia. Chemotherapy improves survival compared to best supportive care, however the optimal regimen is unclear.

=== Pancreatic cancer ===
Upper and lower human gastrointestinal tract

Pancreatic cancer is the fifth most-common cause of cancer-related deaths in the United States, and the seventh most-common in Europe. In 2008, globally there were 280,000 new cases of pancreatic cancer reported and 265,000 deaths. These cancers are classified as endocrine or nonendocrine tumors. The most common is ductal adenocarcinoma. The most significant risk factors for pancreatic cancer are advanced age (over 60) and smoking. Chronic pancreatitis, diabetes or other conditions may also be involved in their development. Early pancreatic cancer does not tend to result in any symptoms, but when a tumor is advanced, a patient may experience severe pain in the upper abdomen, possibly radiating to the back. Another symptom might be jaundice, a yellowing of the skin and eyes.

Pancreatic cancer has a poor prognosis, with a five-year survival rate of less than 5%. By the time the cancer is diagnosed, it is usually at an advanced, inoperable stage. Only one in about fifteen to twenty patients is curative surgery attempted. Pancreatic cancer tends to be aggressive, and it resists radiotherapy and chemotherapy.

=== Liver cancer ===
People get liver cancer (also called hepatocellular carcinoma, HCC or hepatoma) typically from a prolonged Hepatitis B or C infection or as a result of cirrhosis from chronic alcoholism. Liver cancer may bring about yellowing of the skin and eyes (jaundice), itching (pruritus), or cause a buildup of fluid in the abdomen (ascites). A person may feel an enlarging mass, or the cancer might be revealed by abnormal liver function tests.

An attending practitioner might order a biopsy, an MRI or a CT scan, and a patient might be monitored through blood tests (including alpha-fetoprotein, liver-function tests or ultrasound. These cancers are typically treated according to their TNM stage and whether or not cirrhosis is present. Options include surgical resection, embolisation, ablation or a liver transplant.

=== Gallbladder cancer ===
Cancers of the gallbladder are typically adenocarcinomas, and are common in elderly women. Gallbladder cancer is strongly associated with gallstones, a porcelain gallbladder appearance on ultrasound, and the presence of polyps within the gallbladder. Gallbladder cancer may manifest with weight loss, jaundice, and pain in the upper right of. It is typically diagnosed with ultrasound and staged with CT. The prognosis for gallbladder cancer is poor.

=== Other ===
- MALT lymphoma is a cancer of the mucosa-associated lymphoid tissue, usually in the stomach.
- Gastrointestinal stromal tumors represent from 1% to 3% of gastrointestinal malignancies.
- Cancers of the biliary tree, including cholangiocarcinoma.

== Lower digestive tract ==
=== Colorectal cancer ===
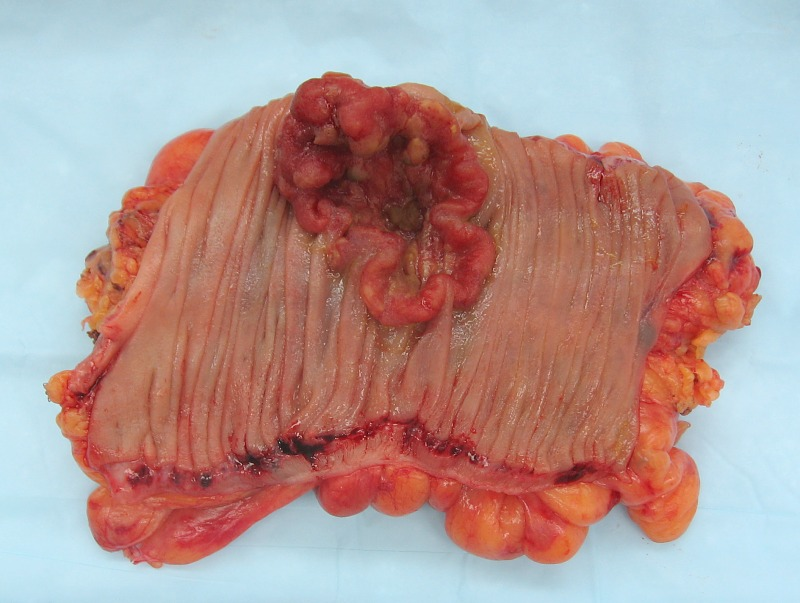
Example of an invasive colorectal cancer.

Colorectal cancer is a disease of old age. It typically originates in the secretory cells lining the gut, and risk factors include diets low in vegetable fibre and high in fat. If a younger person gets such a cancer, it is often associated with hereditary syndromes like Peutz-Jegher's, hereditary nonpolyposis colorectal cancer, or familial adenomatous polyposis. Colorectal cancer can be detected through the bleeding of a polyp, colicky bowel pain, a bowel obstruction or the biopsy of a polyp at a screening colonoscopy. A constant feeling of having to go to the toilet or anemia might also point to this kind of cancer.

Use of a colonoscope can find these cancers, and a biopsy can reveal the extent of the involvement of the bowel wall. Removal of a section of the colon is necessary for treatment, with or without chemotherapy. Colorectal cancer has a comparatively good prognosis when detected early.

The International Agency for Research on Cancer (IARC) that is associated with the World Health Organization (WHO) has classified processed meat as a group I carcinogen, since the IARC found sufficient evidence that human consumption of processed meat causes colorectal cancer. Bile acids (released into the colon upon ingestion of meat) are also implicated as an important factor in the development of colorectal cancer. The bile acid deoxycholic acid is increased in the colonic contents of humans consuming a high fat diet. In populations that have a high incidence of colorectal cancer, fecal concentrations of bile acids are higher.

A 2025 meta analysis reported on the relationship of fecal bile acid concentrations to the development and progression of colorectal cancer and found that higher fecal concentrations of the bile acids cholic acid and chenodeoxycholic acid are associated with a high risk and higher incidence of colorectal cancer.

=== Anal cancer ===
An important anatomic landmark in anal cancer is the pectinate line (dentate line), which is located about 1–2 cm from the anal verge (where the anal mucosa of the anal canal becomes skin). Anal cancers located above this line (towards the head) are more likely to be carcinomas, whilst those located below (towards the feet) are more likely to be squamous cell carcinomas that may ulcerate. Anal cancer is strongly associated with ulcerative colitis and the sexually transmissible infections HPV and HIV. Anal cancer may be a cause of constipation or tenesmus, or may be felt as a palpable mass, although it may occasionally present as an ulcerative form.

Anal cancer is investigated by biopsy and may be treated by surgery and radiotherapy, or with external beam radiotherapy and adjunctive chemotherapy. The five-year survival rate with the latter procedure is above 70%.

=== Gastrointestinal carcinoid tumor ===
A gastrointestinal carcinoid tumor is a rare, slow-growing form of cancer that affects certain cells in the lining of the stomach and intestines. The cells it affects make hormones that regulate the production of digestive juices and muscles that move food through the stomach and intestines. This kind of cancer usually occurs in the appendix, small intestine, or rectum. Its presence is associated with an increased risk of cancers affecting the other parts of the digestive system. It is usually treated with surgery.

== Field defects ==
A "field defect" or "field cancerization" is a region of tissue that precedes and predisposes to the development of cancer. Field defects occur in progression to gastrointestinal tract cancers. These field defects may contain visible gross manifestations, epigenetic alterations and/or mutations.

=== Esophagus ===
Adenocarcinomas of the esophagus tend to arise in a field defect called Barrett's esophagus, a red patch of tissue in the generally pink lower esophagus. A diagnosis of Barrett's esophagus is confirmed by a metaplastic change of the esophageal mucosa from squamous to columnar mucosa with intestinal metaplasia. Barrett's esophagus is the dominant pre-malignant lesion of esophageal adenocarcinoma, and has prevalent epigenetic alterations.

Esophageal squamous-cell carcinomas may occur as second primary tumors associated with head and neck cancer, due to field cancerization (i.e. a regional reaction to long-term carcinogenic exposure). A field defect associated with progression towards squamous cell carcinoma can be identified with epigenetic markers.

=== Stomach ===
Gastric cancer develops within areas (field defects) of the stomach with atrophic gastritis and intestinal metaplasia: these lesions represent the cancerization field in which (intestinal-type) gastric cancers develop. In one study, the field defect was clearly demonstrated in gastric carcinogenesis using miRNA high throughput data from normal gastric mucosa (from patients who had never had a gastric malignant neoplasm), non-tumor tissue adjacent to a gastric cancer, and gastric cancer tissue. Greater than five-fold reductions were found in four miRNAs in tumor-adjacent tissues and gastric cancers as compared to those miRNA levels in normal gastric tissues.

=== Large intestine ===
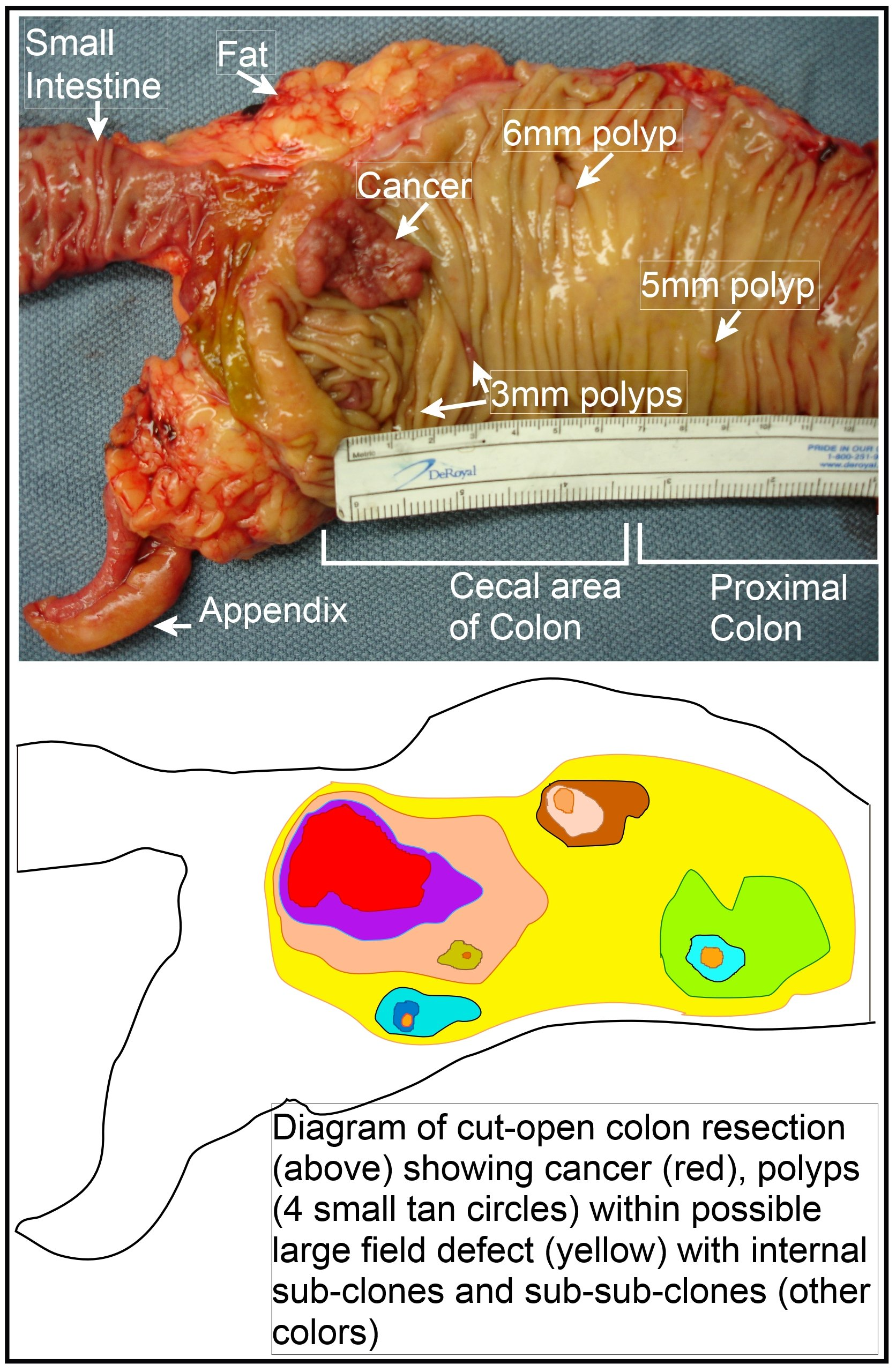
Longitudinally opened freshly resected colon segment showing a cancer and four polyps. Plus a schematic diagram indicating a likely field defect (a region of tissue that precedes and predisposes to the development of cancer) in this colon segment. The diagram indicates sub-clones and sub-sub-clones that were precursors to the tumors.

When a segment of the large intestine, containing a colorectal cancer, is removed, the area adjacent to the cancer (and removed with it) may show additional neoplasia in the form of polyps (see image). This is visual evidence of a field defect. Some of these polyps may be premalignant neoplastic tumors. As shown by Hofstad et al., when polyps are allowed to remain in the colon and are observed for three years, about 40% of polyps are seen to grow larger, likely progressing towards cancer. Luo et al. summarized the substantial body of evidence that field cancerization occurs in the colon, often due to aberrant DNA methylation.

== Etiology ==
Bile acids are synthesized in the liver to facilitate digestion of dietary fats. High exposure of the gastrointestinal tract to bile acids can occur in several different settings, but most significantly is prevalent among individuals who have a high dietary fat intake. High bile acid exposure has been implicated in several cancers of both the upper and lower digestive tract. The deleterious effects on cells of elevated bile acid exposure include induction of reactive oxygen species, induction of DNA damage leading to mutation, and induction of apoptosis in the short term and selection for apoptosis resistance over the long term. High levels of bile acids also alter the microbiome and act as signaling molecules, altering the microenvironment of the colon.
