= Armitage–Doll multistage model of carcinogenesis =

Statistical model in biology

The Armitage–Doll model is a statistical model of carcinogenesis, proposed in 1954 by Peter Armitage and Richard Doll, in which a series of discrete mutations result in cancer. The original paper has recently been reprinted with a set of commentary articles.

== The model ==
The rate of incidence and mortality from a wide variety of common cancers follows a power law: someone's risk of developing a cancer increases with a power of their age.

The model is very simple, and reads

$\mathrm{rate} = \frac{N p_1 p_2 p_3 \cdots p_r}{(r-1)!} t^{r-1}$

in Ashley's notation.

Their interpretation was that a series of $r$ mutations were required to initiate a tumour. This is now widely accepted, and part of the mainstream view of carcinogenesis. In their original paper, they found that $r$ was typically between 5 and 7. Other cancers were later discovered to require fewer mutations: retinoblastoma, typically emerging in early childhood, can emerge from as few as 1 or 2, depending on pre-existing genetic factors.

== History ==
This was some of the earliest strong evidence that cancer was the result of an accumulation of mutations. With their 1954 paper, Armitage and Doll began a line of research that led to Knudson's two-hit hypothesis and thus the discovery of tumour suppressor genes.
