= Field cancerization =

Transformation of large areas of cells into cancerous forms

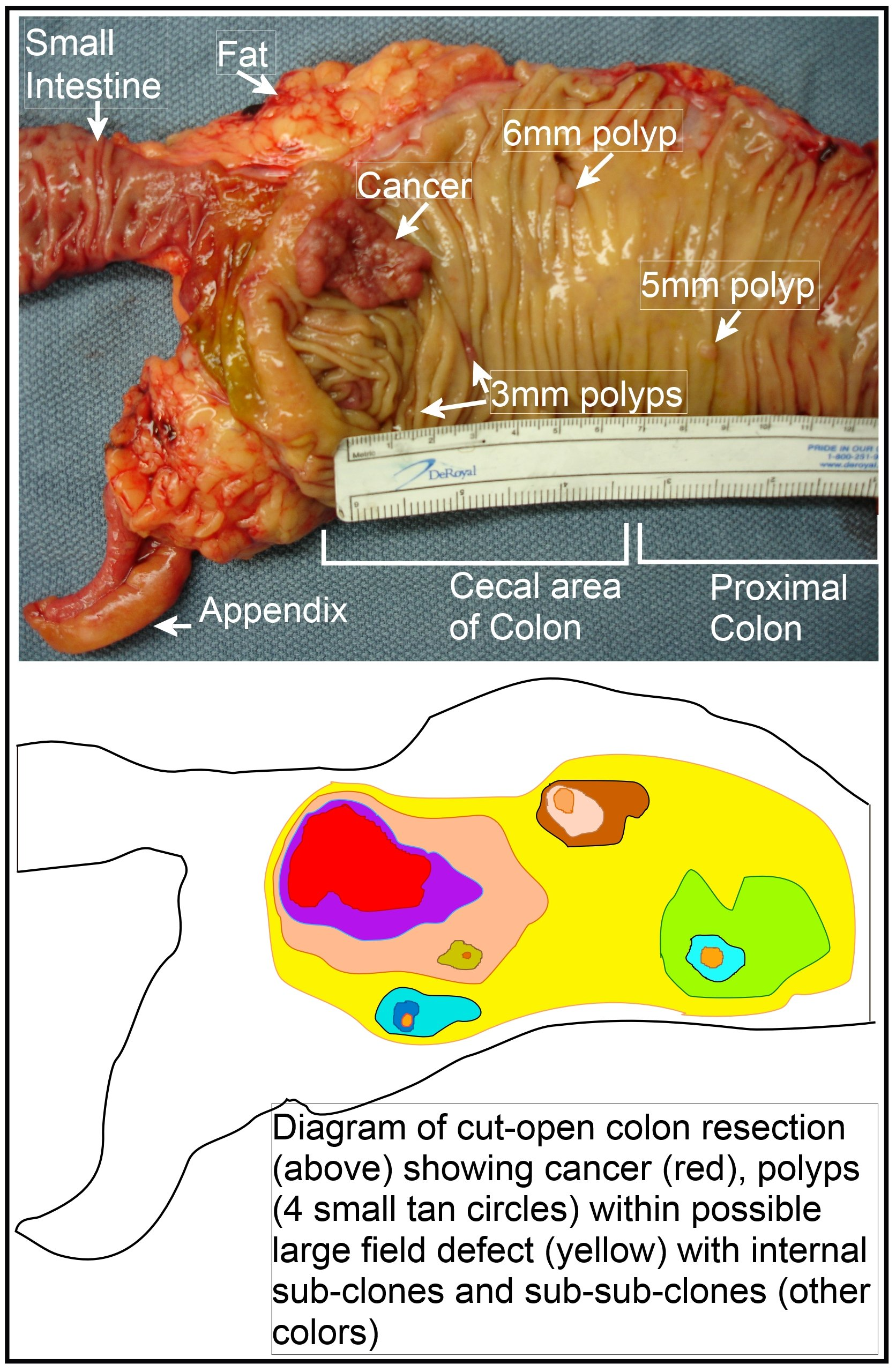
Longitudinally opened freshly resected colon segment showing a cancer and four polyps. Plus a schematic diagram indicating a likely field defect (a region of tissue that precedes and predisposes to the development of cancer) in this colon segment. The diagram indicates sub-clones and sub-sub-clones that were precursors to the tumors.

Field cancerization or field effect (also termed field change, field change cancerization, field carcinogenesis, cancer field effect or premalignant field defect) is a biological process in which large areas of cells at a tissue surface or within an organ are affected by carcinogenic alterations. The process arises from exposure to an injurious environment, often over a lengthy period.

== How it arises ==
The initial step in field cancerization is associated with various molecular lesions such as acquired genetic mutations and epigenetic changes, occurring over a widespread, multi-focal "field". These initial molecular changes may subsequently progress to cytologically recognizable premalignant foci of dysplasia, and eventually to carcinoma in situ (CIS) or cancer. The image of a longitudinally opened colon resection on this page shows an area of a colon resection that likely has a field cancerization or field defect. It has one cancer and four premalignant polyps.

Field cancerization can occur in any tissue. Prominent examples of field cancerization include premalignant field defects in head and neck cancer, lung cancer, colorectal cancer, Barrett's esophagus, skin, breast ducts and bladder. Field cancerization has implications for cancer surveillance and treatment. Despite adequate resection and being histologically normal, the remaining locoregional tissue has an increased risk for developing multiple independent cancers, either synchronously or metachronously.

== Common early carcinogenic alterations ==
A common carcinogenic alteration, found in many cancers and in their adjacent field defects from which the cancers likely arose, is reduced expression of one or more DNA repair enzymes. Since reduced DNA repair expression is often present in a field cancerization or a field defect, it is likely to have been an early step in progression to the cancer.

Frequency of finding epigenetic reductions in protein expression of DNA repair genes in sporadic cancers and in adjacent field defects
Cancer	Gene	Frequency in Cancer	Frequency in Field Defect	Ref.
Colorectal	MGMT	46%	34%	
Colorectal	MGMT	47%	11%	
Colorectal	MGMT	70%	60%	
Colorectal	MSH2	13%	5%	
Colorectal	ERCC1	100%	40%	
Colorectal	PMS2	88%	50%	
Colorectal	XPF	55%	40%	
Head and Neck	MGMT	54%	38%	
Head and Neck	MLH1	33%	25%	
Head and Neck	MLH1	31%	20%	
Stomach	MGMT	88%	78%	
Stomach	MLH1	73%	20%	
Esophagus	MLH1	77%-100%	23%-79%	

Field defects associated with gastrointestinal tract cancers also commonly displayed reduced apoptosis competence, aberrant proliferation and genomic instability. Field defects of the gastrointestinal tract that show those common faults occurred in the oropharynx, esophagus, stomach, bile duct, pancreas, small intestine and colon/rectum.

== Pattern of alterations in a field defect ==
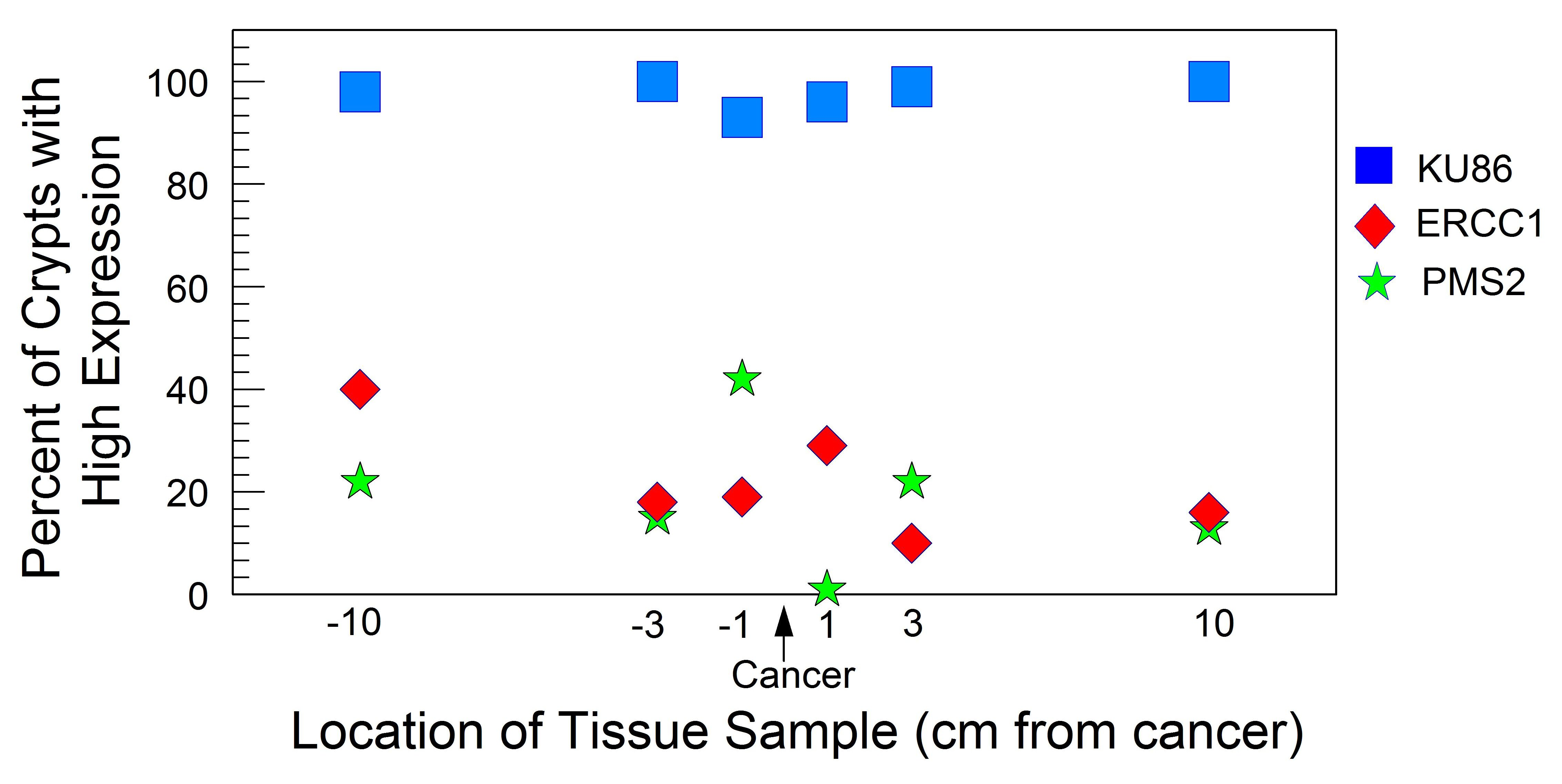
A colon cancer resection, 22 cm long, had 6 tissue samples evaluated for expression of 3 DNA repair proteins, Ku86, ERCC1 and PMS2. All 3 proteins are expressed at near 100% in colon tissue from a person without any colonic neoplasia, but adjacent to a colon cancer, in this instance, there is a field of more than 20 cm in which ERCC1 and PMS2 have reduced expression.

The field defect adjacent to a colon cancer consists of the inner surface of the colon (the epithelium) that has about 1 million crypts (indentations in the surface of the epithelium). Each crypt has about 5,000 cells in the shape of a test-tube and all 5,000 cells of the crypt are generated from the few stem cells at the base of the crypt. The stem cells at the base of the crypt can undergo "crypt conversion" where a stem cell with a selective advantage takes over the stem cell niche, and all cells of that crypt display consistent expression (high or low) of a protein being evaluated.

The diagram shows results obtained by Facista et al. A particular colon resection from a colon cancer patient was evaluated for expression of 3 different DNA repair enzymes: Ku86 (active in the non-homologous end joining pathway), ERCC1 (active in the nucleotide excision DNA repair pathway) and PMS2 (active in the mismatch DNA repair pathway). The percent of crypts in 6 tissue samples taken within the field defect were evaluated for frequency of high levels of expression of each of the repair proteins. Almost every crypt in all tissue samples from this patient showed high expression of KU86. However, the majority of crypts in all 6 tissue samples were reduced or absent in protein expression of ERCC1 and PMS2. The crypts with reduced or absent expression of ERCC1 or PMS2 usually occurred in large patches of adjacent crypts. Both ERCC1 and PMS2, in these tissue samples, were thought to be deficient due to epigenetic alterations.
