= IRX =

IRX may refer to:

- Irish Rallycross Championship, a Rallycross championship in the Republic of Ireland
- irx, the ISO 639-3 code for Kamberau language
- Aria Air, the ICAO code IRX
- Iroquois homeobox protein family
  - IRX1
  - IRX2
  - IRX3
  - IRX4
  - IRX5
  - IRX6
