= IRX1 =

Protein-coding gene in the species Homo sapiens

Identifiers
- Aliases: IRX1, IRX-5, IRXA1, iroquois homeobox 1
- External IDs: OMIM: 606197; MGI: 1197515; GeneCards: IRX1

Gene location (Human)
Chr.	Chromosome 5 (human)
Band	5p15.33	Start	3,595,832 bp
Band	5p15.33	End	3,601,403 bp

Gene location (Mouse)
Chr.	Chromosome 13 (mouse)
Band	13 C1|13 38.43 cM	Start	72,106,040 bp
Band	13 C1|13 38.43 cM	End	72,111,842 bp
RNA expression pattern
Bgee	Human / Mouse (ortholog); Top expressed in: parotid gland; epithelium of lactiferous gland; lactiferous duct; renal medulla; skin of arm; minor salivary glands; gonad; human kidney; skin of leg; subcutaneous adipose tissue / Top expressed in: vestibular membrane of cochlear duct; digit; right lung; left lung; parotid gland; right lung lobe; incisor; otic placode; interventricular septum; lip; More reference expression data
BioGPS	n/a
Gene ontology
Molecular function	DNA binding; DNA-binding transcription repressor activity, RNA polymerase II-specific; sequence-specific DNA binding; DNA-binding transcription factor activity, RNA polymerase II-specific
Cellular component	nucleus
Biological process	specification of loop of Henle identity; metanephros development; regulation of transcription, DNA-templated; proximal/distal pattern formation involved in metanephric nephron development; negative regulation of transcription by RNA polymerase II
Sources:Amigo / QuickGO
Orthologs
Databases	NCBI: entry; OMA: entry
Species	Human	Mouse
Entrez	79192	16371
Ensembl	ENSG00000170549	ENSMUSG00000060969
UniProt	P78414	P81068
RefSeq (mRNA)	NM_024337	NM_010573
RefSeq (protein)	NP_077313	NP_034703
Location (UCSC)	Chr 5: 3.6 – 3.6 Mb	Chr 13: 72.11 – 72.11 Mb
PubMed search
- Wikidata
View/Edit Human	View/Edit Mouse

Iroquois-class homeodomain protein IRX-1, also known as Iroquois homeobox protein 1, is a protein that in humans is encoded by the IRX1 gene. All members of the Iroquois (IRO) family of proteins share two highly conserved features, encoding both a homeodomain and a characteristic IRO sequence motif. Members of this family are known to play numerous roles in early embryo patterning. IRX1 has also been shown to act as a tumor suppressor gene in several forms of cancer.

== Role in development ==
IRX1 is a member of the Iroquois homeobox gene family. Members of this family play multiple roles during pattern formation in embryos of numerous vertebrate and invertebrate species. IRO genes are thought to function early in development to define large territories, and again later in development for further patterning specification. Experimental data suggest roles for IRX1 in vertebrates may include development and patterning of lungs, limbs, heart, eyes, and nervous system.

== Gene ==
=== Overview ===
IRX1 is located on the forward DNA strand (see Sense (molecular biology)) of chromosome 5, from position 3596054 - 3601403 at the 5p15.3 location. The human gene product is an 1858 base pair mRNA with 4 predicted exons in humans. Promoter analysis was performed using El Dorado through the Genomatix software page. The predicted promoter region spans 1040 base pairs from position 3595468 through 3595468 on the forward strand of chromosome 5.

=== Gene neighborhood ===
IRX1 is relatively isolated, with no other protein coding genes found from position 3177835 – 5070004.

=== Expression ===
Microarray and RNA seq data suggest that IRX1 is ubiquitously expressed at low levels in adult tissues, with the highest relative levels of expression occurring in the heart, adipose, kidney, and breast tissues. Moderate to high levels are also indicated in the lung, prostate and stomach. Promoter analysis with the El Dorado program from Genomatix predicted that IRX1 expression is regulated by factors that include E2F cell cycle regulators, NRF1, and ZF5, and brachyury. Expression data from human, mouse, and developing mouse brains are available though the Allen Brain Atlas.

== Protein ==
=== Properties and characteristics ===
The mature IRX1 protein has 480 amino acid residues, with a molecular mass of 49,600 daltons and an isoelectric point of 5.7. A BLAST search revealed that IRX1 contains two highly conserved domains: a homeodomain and a characteristic IRO motif of unknown function. The homeodomain belongs to the TALE (three amino acid loop extension) class of homeodomains, and is characterized by the addition of three extra amino acids between the first and second helix of three alpha helices that comprise the domain. The presence of this well characterized homeodomain strongly suggests that IRX1 acts as a transcription factor. This is further supported by the predicted localization of IRX1 to the nucleus. The IRO motif is a region downstream of the homeodomain that is found only in members of the Iroquois-class homeodomain proteins, though its function is poorly understood. However, its similarity to an internal region of the Notch receptor protein suggests that it may be involved with protein-protein interaction. In addition to these two characteristic domains, IRX1 contains a third domain from the HARE-HTH superfamily fused to the C-terminal end of the homeodomain. This domain adopts a winged helix-turn-helix fold predicted to bind DNA, and is thought to play a role in recruiting effector activities to DNA. Several forms of post-translational modification are predicted, including SUMOylation, C-mannosylation, and phosphorylation, using bioinformatics tools from ExPASy. Bioinformatic analysis of IRX1 with the NetPhos tool predicted 71 potential phosphorylation sites throughout the protein.

=== Protein Interactions ===
Potential protein interacting partners for IRX1 were found using computational tools. The STRING database lists nine putative interacting partners supported by text mining evidence, though closer analysis of the results shows little support for most of these predicted interactions. However, it is possible that one of these proteins, CDKN1A, is involved in the predicted regulation of IRX1 by E2F cell cycle regulators.

== Conservation ==
=== Orthologs ===
IRX1 has a high degree of conservation across vertebrate and invertebrate species. The entire protein is more fully conserved through vertebrate species, while only the homeodomain and IRO motif are conserved in more distant homologs. Homologous sequences were found in species as distantly related to humans as the pig roundworm Ascaris suum, from the family Ascarididae, using BLAST and the ALIGN tool through the San Diego Super Computer Biology Workbench. The following is a table describing the evolutionary conservation of IRX1.

Genus Species	Organism Common Name	Divergence from Humans (MYA)	NCBI Protein Accession Number	Sequence identity	Protein Length	Common Gene Name
Homo sapiens	Humans	--	NP_077313	100%	480	IRX-1
Pongo abelii	Sumatran Orangutan	15.7	XP_002815448	99%	480	IRX-1
Bos taurus	Cattle	94.2	XP_002696496	92.3%	476	IRX-1
Mus musculus	House Mouse	92.3	NP_034703	91.5%	480	IRX-1
Rattus norvegicus	Brown rat	92.3	NP_001100801	90.4%	480	IRX-1
Gallus gallus	Red Junglefowl	296	NP_001025509	72.9%	467	IRX-1
Xenopus tropicalis	Western clawed frog	371.2	NP_001188351	68%	467	IRX-1
Latimeria chalumnae	West Indian Ocean coelacanth	441.9	XP_006002089	65.1%	460	Irx-1-A-like isoform X1
Danio rerio	Zebrafish	400.1	NP_997067	61.1%	426	Irx-1 isoform 1
Taeniopygia guttata	Zebra finch	296	XP_002189063	59.7%	400	Irx-1-A-like
Astyanax mexicanus	Mexican tetra	400.1	XP_007254591.1	58%	450	IRX-1
Ophiophagus hannah	King cobra	296	ETE68928	54.5%	387	Irx-1-A partial
Ovis aries	Sheep	94.2	XP_004017207	43.3%	260	IRX-1
Condylura cristata	Star-nosed mole	94.2	XP_004678440	41.7%	342	IRX-1
Branchiostoma floridae	Lancelet	713.2	ACF10237.1	35.5%	461	Iroquois A isoform 1
Strongylocentrotus purpuratus	Purple sea urchin	742.9	NP_001123285	31.7%	605	Iroquois homeobox A
Ascaris suum	Pig roundworm	937.5	F1KXE6	29%	444	IRX-1
Caenorhabditis elegans	Nematode roundworm	937.5	NP_492533.2	28.6%	377	IRX-1
Drosophila melanogaster	Fruit fly	782.7	NP_524045	27%	717	Araucan isoform A

=== Paralogs ===
IRX1 is one of six members of the Iroquois-class homeodomain proteins found in humans: IRX2, IRX3, IRX4, IRX5, and IRX6. IRX1, IRX2, and IRX4 are found on human chromosome 5, and their orientation corresponds to that of IRX3, IRX5, and IRX6 found on human chromosome 16. It is thought that the genomic organization of IRO genes in conserved gene clusters allows for coregulation and enhancer sharing during development.
