= Ada regulon =

Escherichia coli adaptive response protein

In DNA repair, the Ada regulon is a set of genes whose expression is essential to adaptive response (also known as "Ada response", hence the name), which is triggered in prokaryotic cells by exposure to sub-lethal doses of alkylating agents. This allows the cells to tolerate the effects of such agents, which are otherwise toxic and mutagenic.

The Ada response includes the expression of four genes: ada, alkA, alkB, and aidB. The product of ada gene, the Ada protein, is an activator of transcription of all four genes. DNA bases damaged by alkylation are removed by distinct strategies.

== Alkylating agents ==
The alkylating agents from a group of mutagens and carcinogens that modify DNA by alkylation. Alkyl base lesions can arrest replication, interrupt transcription, or signal the activation of cell cycle checkpoints or apoptosis. In mammals, they could be involved in carcinogenesis, neurodegenerative disease and aging. The alkylating agents can introduce methyl or ethyl groups at all of the available nitrogen and oxygen atoms in DNA bases, providing a number of lesions.

The majority of evidence indicates that among the 11 identified base modification two, 3-methyladenine (3meA) and O^{6}-methylguanine (O^{6}-meG), are mainly responsible for the biological effects of alkylation agents.

== Roles of ada-regulated genes ==
The Ada protein is composed of two major domains, a C-terminal domain and an N-terminal one, linked by a hinge region susceptible to proteolytic cleavage. These domains can function independently. AdaCTD transfers methyl adducts from O^{6}-meG and O^{4}-meG onto its Cys-321 residue, whereas AdaNTD demethylates methyl-phosphotriesters by methyl transfer onto its Cys-38 residue.

The alkA gene encodes a glycosylase that repairs a variety of lesions including N-7-Methylguanine and N-3-Methylpurines and O^{2}-methyl pyrimidines. The AlkA protein removes a damaged base from the sugar-phosphate backbone by cleaving the glycosylic bond attaching the base to the sugar, producing an abasic site. Further processing of the abasic site by AP endonucleases, polymerase I, and ligase then completes the repair.

AlkB, one of the Escherichia coli adaptive response proteins, uses an α ketoglutarate/Fe(II)-dependent mechanism that, by chemical oxidation, removes a variety of alkyl lesions from DNA, thus affording protection of the genome against alkylation.

The AidB protein has been supposed to take part in the degradation of endogenous alkylating agents. It shows some homology to acyl-CoA oxidases and those containing flavins. Recent observations suggest that AidB may bind to double-stranded DNA and take part in its dealkylation. However, to determine the precise function of AidB further investigations are necessary.

== Regulation of transcription ==
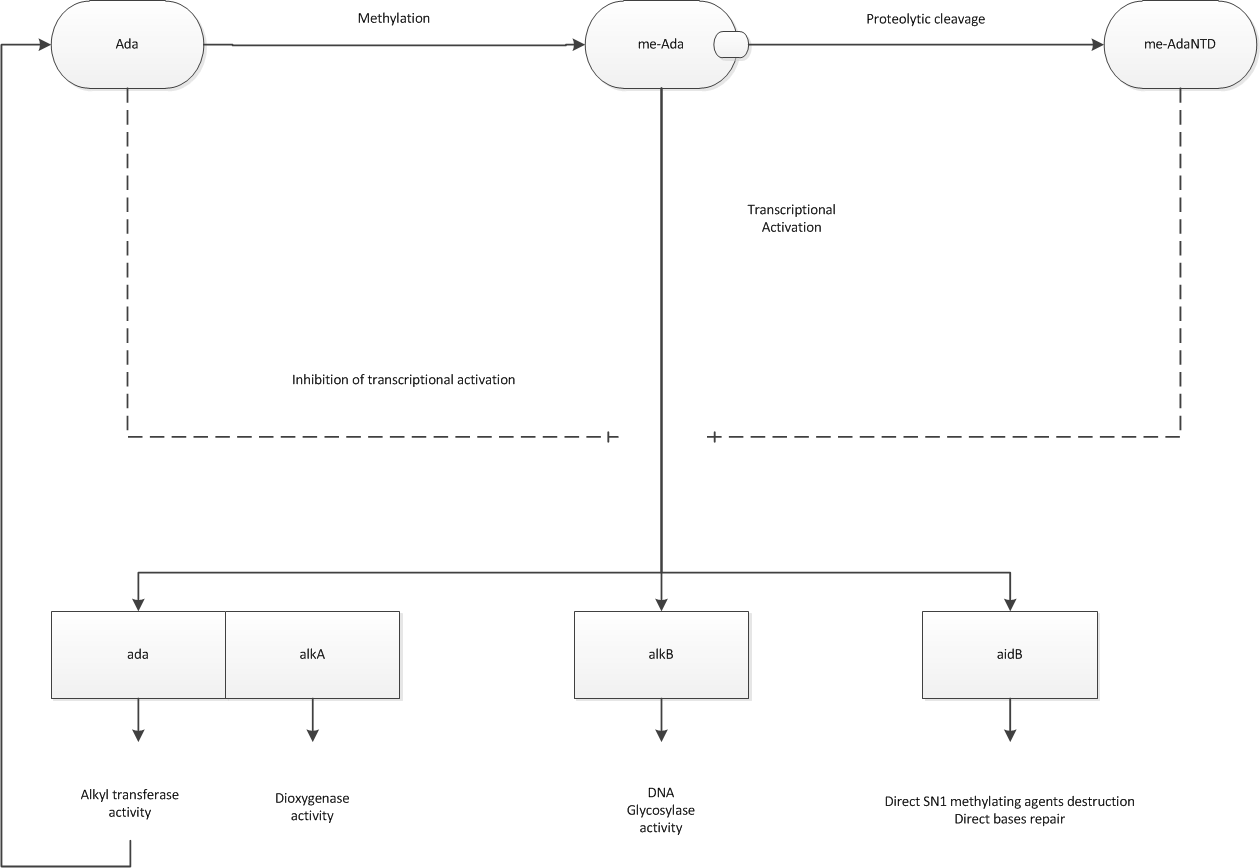
Ada Regulatory network

The Ada response includes the expression of four genes: ada, alkA, alkB, and aidB. The product of the ada gene, the Ada protein is an activator of transcription of all four genes.

Ada has two active methyl acceptor cysteine residues that are required for demethylation of DNA. Both sites can become methylated when Ada protein transfers the methyl group from the appropriate DNA lesions to itself. This reaction is irreversible and methylated Ada (me-Ada) can act as a transcriptional activator.

The Ada protein activates the transcription of the Ada regulon in two different ways. In case of the ada-alkB operon, and the aidB promoter, the N-terminal domain (AdaNTD) is involved in DNA binding and interacts with the a unit of RNA polymerase, whereas and the methylated C-terminal domain (me-AdaCTD) interacts with the σ_{70} subunit of RNA polymerase. Although these interactions are independent, both are necessary for transcription activation.

For activation of alkA gene, the AdaNTD interacts with both, the α and σ subunits of RNA polymerase, and activates transcription. In contrast to the ada and aidB promoters, the unmethylated form of the Ada protein, as well as methylated form of the AdaNTD, is able to activate the transcription at alkA.

Methylated Ada is able to activate transcription by σ_{S} as well as σ_{70} at both the ada and aidB promoters. In contrast, not only does me-Ada fail to stimulate alkA transcription by σ_{S}, but it negatively affects σ_{S} dependent transcription.

Intracellular concentrations of σ_{S} increase when the cells reach stationary phase; this in turn results in a me-Ada mediated decrease in the expression of AlkA. Therefore, an increase in expression of the adaptive response genes, in parallel with the expression of genes producing endogenous alkylators during the stationary phase, prevents alkylation damage to DNA and mutagenesis.

== Homologues of the Ada regulon in humans ==
In human cells, the alkyltransferase activity is the product of the MGMT gene. The 21.7 kDa MGMT protein is built of amino-acid sequences very similar to those of E. coli alkyltransferases, like Ada. In contrast to the bacterial enzymes it mainly repairs O^{6}meG, whereas removal of the alkyl adduct from O^{4}meT is much slower and significantly less effective. The preferential repair of O^{6}meG is profitable for eukaryotic cells since in experimental animals treated with alkylating carcinogens this lesion is involved in tumor stimulation.

Unlike the Ada and the human MGMT methyltransferases, AlkB and its human homologs hABH2 and hABH3 not only reverse alkylation base damage directly, but they do so catalytically and with a substrate specificity aimed at the base-pairing interface of the G:C and A:T base pairs. Crystal structures of AlkB and its human homologue hABH3 have shown similar overall folds, highlighting conserved functional domains.
