= C6H7N5O =

The molecular formula C_{6}H_{7}N_{5}O (molar mass: 165.15 g/mol, exact mass: 165.0651 u) may refer to:

- 6-O-Methylguanine
- 7-Methylguanine
