= Bernd Kaina =

German biologist and toxicologist

Bernd Kaina, born on 7 January 1950 in Drewitz, is a German biologist and toxicologist. His research is devoted to DNA damage and repair, DNA damage response, genotoxic signaling and cell death induced by carcinogenic DNA damaging insults.

== Education ==
Kaina completed his degree in biology at the Martin Luther University of Halle-Wittenberg, where he also completed his PhD thesis on the effects of the neurotropic carcinogen N-methyl-N-nitrosourea on human cells. From 1975 to 1984, he was a project leader at the Central Institute for Genetics and Crop Plant Research in Gatersleben and focused on the genotoxic effect of alkylating agents and adaptive response in various experimental systems. From 1984 to 1985, he was a scholarship holder of the European Community at the Institute of Molecular Biology in Leiden, Netherlands, and afterwards, from 1985 to 1987, he was a guest researcher at the German Cancer Research Centre in Heidelberg, Germany. As a Heisenberg Fellow of the German Research Foundation (DFG), he moved to the Institute of Genetics and Toxicology at the Nuclear Research Centre in Karlsruhe. From there, he was appointed as full professor and Head of Division of Applied Toxicology at the Institute of Toxicology of the Johannes Gutenberg-University in Mainz, Germany. Since 2004, he is the director of the Institute of Toxicology at the University Medical Centre of the Johannes Gutenberg-University in Mainz.

== Research ==
Kaina made significant contributions to our understanding of the effects of alkylating carcinogens and chemotherapeutic agents. He identified the repair enzyme O-6-methylguanine-DNA methyltransferase (MGMT) as a protection mechanism against the killing, clastogenic, recombinogenic and carcinogenic effects of alkylating carcinogens. In a translational research program, his group studied the importance of DNA repair in drug resistance of glioblastomas, malignant melanomas and other tumour types. He also contributed to a deeper insight of the mutagenic and cytotoxic effect of UV light, ionizing radiation and chemical genotoxins, assessed the regulation of repair genes and showed that specific DNA repair functions can be induced following genotoxic stress, thus contributing to the cells’ adaptation to these detrimental exposure. He demonstrated a repair defect in immunocompetent cells (monocytes) and assessed the regulation of repair genes by cytokines. He is also engaged in studies on the genotoxic effects of TCM drugs such as artesunate. He contributed to more than 300 publications in internationally respected journals and books.

== Awards and honours ==
- Frits Sobels Award of the European Environmental Mutagene and Genomics Society (2021)
- Ulrich-Hagen Award of the German Society for Radiation Biology (2014)
- Toxicology Award of the German Association for Experimental and Clinical Pharmacology and Toxicology (2012)
- German Cancer Award, experimental part (2011)
- Research Award of the German Environmental Mutagen Society (2009)
- Heisenberg Fellow of the German Research Foundation

== Selected publications ==
- Roos, Wynand P.; Thomas, Adam D.; Kaina, Bernd (18 December 2015). "DNA damage and the balance between survival and death in cancer biology". Nature Reviews Cancer. 16 (1). Springer Science and Business Media LLC: 20–33. doi:10.1038/nrc.2015.2. ISSN 1474-175X. PMID 26678314. S2CID 10159855.
- Roos, Wynand P.; Kaina, Bernd (2013). "DNA damage-induced cell death: From specific DNA lesions to the DNA damage response and apoptosis". Cancer Letters. 332 (2). Elsevier BV: 237–248. doi:10.1016/j.canlet.2012.01.007. ISSN 0304-3835. PMID 22261329.
- Bauer, M.; Goldstein, M.; Christmann, M.; Becker, H.; Heylmann, D.; Kaina, B. (12 December 2011). "Human monocytes are severely impaired in base and DNA double-strand break repair that renders them vulnerable to oxidative stress". Proceedings of the National Academy of Sciences. 108 (52): 21105–21110. Bibcode:2011PNAS..10821105B. doi:10.1073/pnas.1111919109. ISSN 0027-8424. PMC 3248544. PMID 22160723.
- Kaina, Bernd; Margison, Geoffrey P.; Christmann, Markus (18 August 2010). "Targeting O 6-methylguanine-DNA methyltransferase with specific inhibitors as a strategy in cancer therapy". Cellular and Molecular Life Sciences. 67 (21). Springer Science and Business Media LLC: 3663–3681. doi:10.1007/s00018-010-0491-7. ISSN 1420-682X. PMC 11115711. PMID 20717836. S2CID 23967940.
- Kaina, Bernd; Christmann, Markus; Naumann, Steffen; Roos, Wynand P. (2007). "MGMT: Key node in the battle against genotoxicity, carcinogenicity and apoptosis induced by alkylating agents". DNA Repair. 6 (8). Elsevier BV: 1079–1099. doi:10.1016/j.dnarep.2007.03.008. ISSN 1568-7864. PMID 17485253.
- Batista, L. F.Z.; Roos, W. P.; Christmann, M.; Menck, C. F.M.; Kaina, B. (15 December 2007). "Differential Sensitivity of Malignant Glioma Cells to Methylating and Chloroethylating Anticancer Drugs: p53 Determines the Switch by Regulating xpc, ddb2, and DNA Double-Strand Breaks". Cancer Research. 67 (24). American Association for Cancer Research (AACR): 11886–11895. doi:10.1158/0008-5472.can-07-2964. ISSN 0008-5472. PMID 18089819.
- Kaina, B. (2004). "Mechanisms and consequences of methylating agent-induced SCEs and chromosomal aberrations: a long road traveled and still a far way to go". Cytogenetic and Genome Research. 104 (1–4). S. Karger AG: 77–86. doi:10.1159/000077469. ISSN 1424-8581. PMID 15162018. S2CID 941369.
- Bernd, Kaina; Fritz, Gerhard; Mitra, Sankar; Coquerelle, Thérèse (1991). "Transfection and expression of human O6-methylguanine-DNA methyltransferase (MGMT) cDNA in Chinese hamster cells: the role of MGMT in protection against the genotoxic effects of alkylating agents". Carcinogenesis. 12 (10). Oxford University Press (OUP): 1857–1867. doi:10.1093/carcin/12.10.1857. ISSN 0143-3334. PMID 1657427.
