= AlkB =

Protein in E. coli

AlkB (Alkylation B) is a protein found in E. coli, induced during an adaptive response and involved in the direct reversal of alkylation damage. AlkB specifically removes alkylation damage to single stranded (SS) DNA caused by S_{N}2 type of chemical agents. It efficiently removes methyl groups from 1-methyl adenines, 3-methyl cytosines in SS DNA. AlkB is an alpha-ketoglutarate-dependent hydroxylase, a superfamily non-haem iron-containing proteins. It oxidatively demethylates the DNA substrate. Demethylation by AlkB is accompanied with release of CO_{2}, succinate, and formaldehyde.

== Human homologs ==
There are nine human homologs of AlkB. They are:

- Alkb homolog 1, histone h2a dioxygenase, ALKBH2, ALKBH3, ALKBH4, AlkB homolog 5, RNA demethylase, ALKBH6, ALKBH7, ALKBH8, FTO

ABH3, like E. coli AlkB, is specific for SS DNA and RNA whereas ABH2 has a higher affinity for damages in double-stranded DNA.

ALKBH8 has an RNA recognition motif, a methyltransferase domain, and an AlkB-like domain. The methyltransferase domain generates the wobble nucleoside 5-methoxycarbonylmethyluridine (mcm5U) from its precursor 5-carboxymethyluridine (cm5U). The AlkB-like domain generates (S)-5-methoxycarbonylhydroxymethyluridine (mchm5U)in Gly-tRNA-UCC.

FTO, which is associated with obesity in humans, is the first identified RNA demethylase. It demethylates N^{6}-methyladenosine in mRNA.

There is also another very different protein called AlkB or alkane hydroxylase. It is the catalytic subunit of a non-heme diiron protein, catalyzing the hydroxylation of alkanes, in aerobic bacteria that can utilize alkanes as a carbon source.

== Virus homologs ==
AlkB domains are present within viral replication-associated proteins of plant RNA viruses of the families Closteroviridae, Alphaflexiviridae, Betaflexiviridae, and Secoviridae. Potyviridae is the largest family of plant RNA viruses; among these the AlkB domain is embedded in P1 proteases of endive necrotic mosaic virus (ENMV) of genus Potyvirus, French endive necrotic mosaic virus (FENMV) of Potyvirus, and blackberry virus Y (BlVY) of Brambyvirus.

== Functions ==
AlkB has since been shown to have an ever expanding range of substrates since its initial discovery by Sedgwick, Lindahl, Seeberg and Falnes. Not only does it remove alkylation damage from the positively charged 1-methyl adenines and 3-methyl cytosines, but also from the neutral bases of 1-methyl guanine and 3-methyl thymine. AlkB has been shown as the first example of a DNA repair enzyme converting one type of DNA damage that blocks DNA replication, to another type of damage that the DNA polymerase can traverse with ease. This was seen for the cyclic lesion ethanoadenine (not to be confused with ethenoadenine...see below), which upon hydroxylation by AlkB, affords an N^{6}-acetaldehyde lesion, thus affording an 'adenine' hydrogen-bonding face. In contrast to the previous types of alkylation damage removed by AlkB via a hydroxylation mechanism, AlkB has been shown to epoxidize the double bond of ethenoadenine, which is hydrolyzed to a diol, and ultimately released as the dialdehyde glyoxal, thus restoring the undamaged adenine in the DNA.

Experimental results show that AlkB domains from plant viruses have RNA demethylase activity in vitro. AlkB homologs from plants show the pro-viral roles, and may participate in plant antiviral immunity by regulating the levels of N^{6}-methyladenosine (m^{6}A), a common type of RNA modification.
