= Methylguanine =

Methylguanine may refer to:

- 1-Methylguanine
- 2-Methylguanine
- 3-Methylguanine
- 6-O-Methylguanine
- 7-Methylguanine
