= OGT =

OGT may refer to:

- Ohio Graduation Test, a statewide exit test as a result of the No Child Left Behind Act
- Original Gangster Tool, someone who claims to have been a fan of hard rock band Tool since the release of their debut EP Opiate in 1992; term appears in Tool's 1996 song "Hooker with a Penis"
- OG: Original Gangster (Original Gangster Thug), a 1991 album by Ice-T
- Protein O-GlcNAc transferase, a human enzyme that catalyzes installation of the O-GlcNAc post-translational modification
- Ogt, O6-alkylguanine DNA alkyltransferase II, a protein also known as AGT II
