= FTO gene =

Protein-coding gene in the species Homo sapiens

FTO
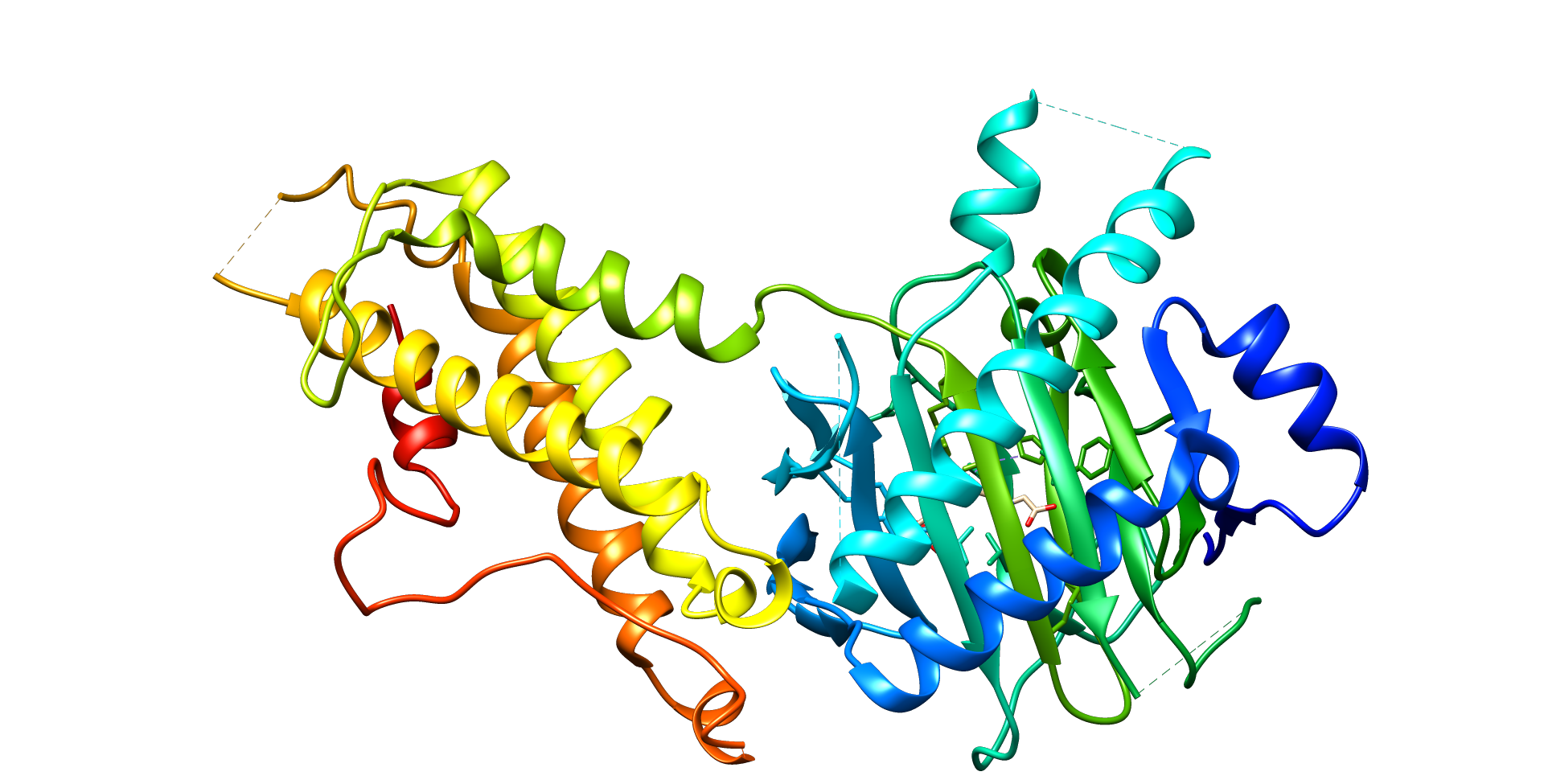

Identifiers
- Aliases: FTO, ALKBH9, GDFD, BMIQ14, fat mass and obesity associated, alpha-ketoglutarate dependent dioxygenase
- External IDs: OMIM: 610966; MGI: 1347093; GeneCards: FTO
Available structures
PDB	Ortholog search: PDBe RCSB
PDB	List of PDB id codes 3LFM, 4IDZ, 4IE0, 4IE4, 4IE5, 4IE6, 4IE7, 4CXW, 4CXX, 4CXY, 4QHO, 4QKN, 4ZS3, 4ZS2
Enzyme activity
EC #	BRENDA	ExPASy	KEGG	MetaCyc
1.14.11.53	↗	↗	↗	↗

Gene location (Human)
Chr.	Chromosome 16 (human)
Band	16q12.2	Start	53,701,692 bp
Band	16q12.2	End	54,158,512 bp

Gene location (Mouse)
Chr.	Chromosome 8 (mouse)
Band	8 C5|8 44.34 cM	Start	92,040,153 bp
Band	8 C5|8 44.34 cM	End	92,395,067 bp
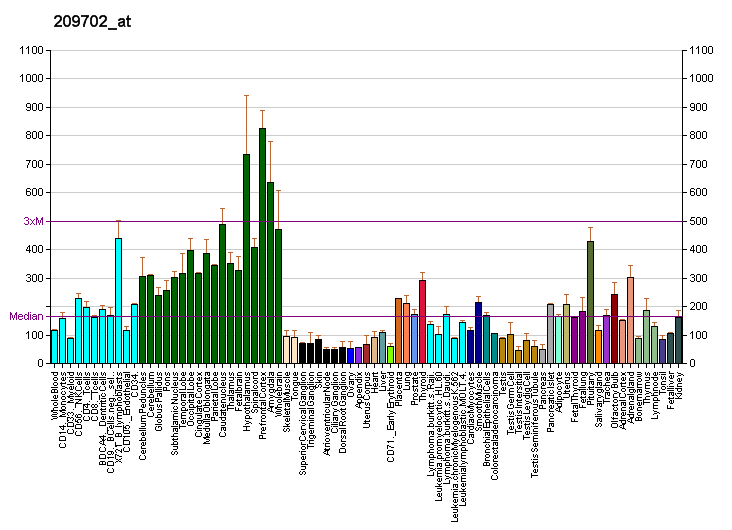

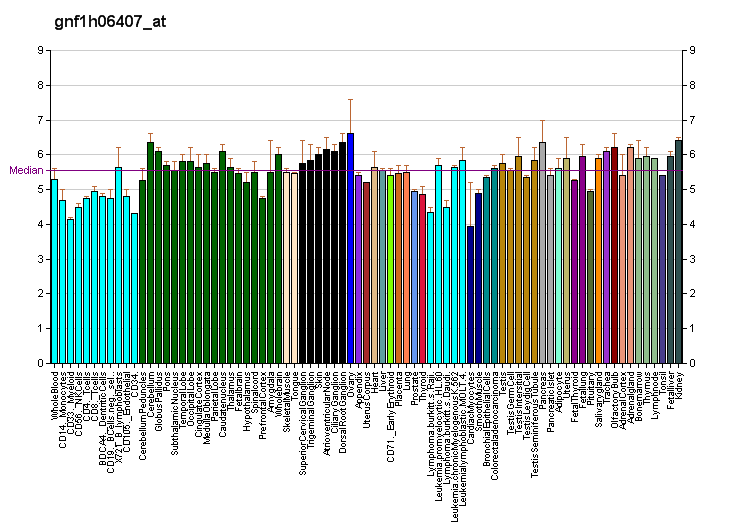
RNA expression pattern
Bgee	Human / Mouse (ortholog); Top expressed in: bronchial epithelial cell; Brodmann area 10; middle frontal gyrus; frontal pole; pars compacta; corpus callosum; dorsal motor nucleus of vagus nerve; lactiferous duct; inferior olivary nucleus; Brodmann area 46 / Top expressed in: genital tubercle; ventral tegmental area; superior colliculus; dorsal tegmental nucleus; dorsomedial hypothalamic nucleus; habenula; pontine nuclei; tail of embryo; subiculum; inferior colliculi; More reference expression data
BioGPS	More reference expression data
Gene ontology
Molecular function	oxidative DNA demethylase activity; dioxygenase activity; metal ion binding; DNA-N1-methyladenine dioxygenase activity; oxidoreductase activity; ferrous iron binding; mRNA N6-methyladenosine dioxygenase activity; oxidative RNA demethylase activity
Cellular component	nuclear speck; nucleus; nucleoplasm
Biological process	regulation of multicellular organism growth; regulation of respiratory system process; regulation of white fat cell proliferation; cellular response to DNA damage stimulus; oxidative demethylation; oxidative single-stranded RNA demethylation; regulation of lipid storage; RNA repair; adipose tissue development; DNA demethylation; regulation of brown fat cell differentiation; temperature homeostasis; oxidative single-stranded DNA demethylation; DNA repair; DNA dealkylation involved in DNA repair
Sources:Amigo / QuickGO
Orthologs
Databases	NCBI: entry; OMA: entry
Species	Human	Mouse
Entrez	79068	26383
Ensembl	ENSG00000140718	ENSMUSG00000055932
UniProt	Q9C0B1	Q8BGW1
RefSeq (mRNA)	NM_001080432	NM_011936
RefSeq (protein)	NP_001073901; NP_001350820; NP_001350823; NP_001350825; NP_001350826 NP_001350827; NP_001350828; NP_001350829; NP_001350830; NP_001350832; NP_001350834; NP_001350917	NP_036066
Location (UCSC)	Chr 16: 53.7 – 54.16 Mb	Chr 8: 92.04 – 92.4 Mb
PubMed search
- Wikidata
View/Edit Human	View/Edit Mouse

Fat mass and obesity-associated protein, also known as alpha-ketoglutarate-dependent dioxygenase FTO, is an enzyme that in humans is encoded by the FTO gene located on chromosome 16. As one homolog in the AlkB family proteins, it is the first messenger RNA (mRNA) demethylase that has been identified. Certain alleles of the FTO gene appear to be correlated with obesity in humans.

== Function ==
The amino acid sequence of the transcribed FTO protein shows high similarity with the enzyme AlkB which oxidatively demethylates DNA. FTO is a member of the superfamily of alpha-ketoglutarate-dependent hydroxylase, which are non-heme iron-containing proteins. Recombinant FTO protein was first discovered to catalyse demethylation of 3-methylthymine in single-stranded DNA, and 3-methyluridine in single-stranded RNA, with low efficiency. The nucleoside N6-methyladenosine (m6A), an abundant modification in RNA, was then found to be a major substrate of FTO. The FTO gene expression was also found to be significantly upregulated in the hypothalamus of rats after food deprivation and strongly negatively correlated with the expression of orexigenic galanin-like peptide which is involved in the stimulation of food intake.

Increases in hypothalamic expression of FTO are associated with the regulation of energy intake but not feeding reward.

People with two copies of the risk allele for the rs9939609 single-nucleotide polymorphism (SNP) showed differing neural responses to food images via fMRI. However, rs9939609's association with FTO is controversial, and may actually affect another gene, called Iroquois homeobox protein 3 (IRX3).

== FTO demethylates RNA ==
FTO has been demonstrated to efficiently demethylate the related modified ribonucleotide, N6,2'-O-dimethyladenosine, and to an equal or lesser extent, m^{6}A, in vitro . FTO knockdown with siRNA led to increased amounts of m^{6}A in polyA-RNA, whereas overexpression of FTO resulted in decreased amounts of m^{6}A in human cells. FTO partially co-localizes with nuclear speckles, which supports the notion that in the nucleus, m^{6}A can be a substrate of FTO. The function of FTO could affect the processing of pre-mRNA, other nuclear RNAs, or both. The discovery of the FTO-mediated oxidative demethylation of RNA may initiate further investigations on biological regulation based on reversible chemical modification of RNA, and identification of RNA substrates for which FTO has the highest affinity.

FTO can oxidize m^{6}A to generate N6-hydroxymethyladenosine (hm^{6}A) as an intermediate modification and N6 - formyladenosine(f^{6}A) as a further oxidized product in mammalian cells.

Plants do not carry orthologs of FTO and artificial introduction of an FTO transgene causes substantial and widespread RNA demethylation. Instead of causing catastrophic disregulation, the treated rice and potato plants show significant (50%) increases in yield and become more tolerant to drought. In mESCs and during mouse development, FTO has been shown to mediated LINE1 RNA m^{6}A demethylation and consequently affect local chromatin state and nearby gene transcription.

== Tissue distribution ==
The FTO gene is widely expressed in both fetal and adult tissues.

== Clinical significance ==
=== Obesity ===
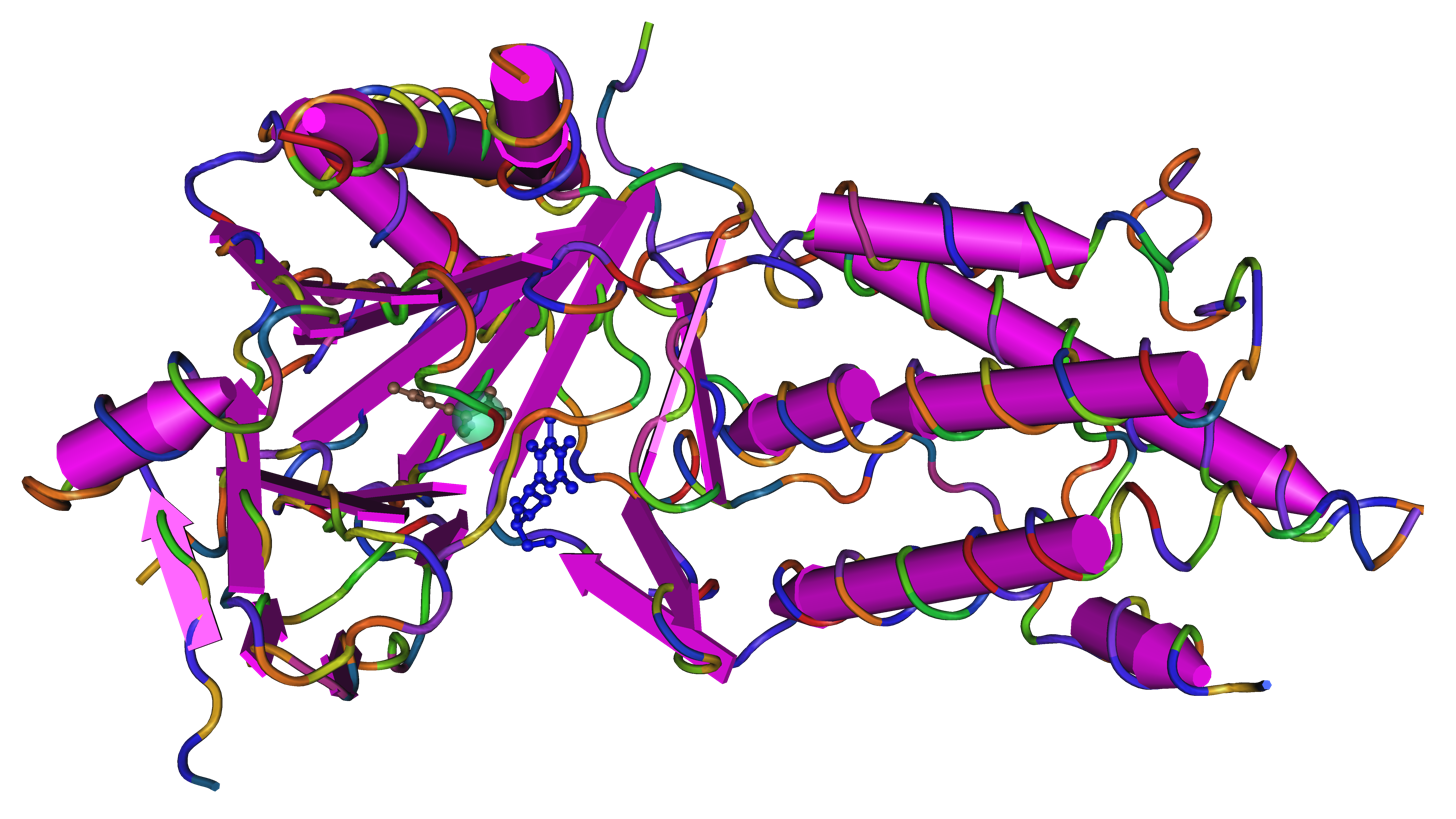
Fat Mass and Obesity-Associated (FTO) Protein

A cohort consisting of 38,759 Europeans was studied for variants of the FTO obesity risk allele. In particular, carriers of one copy of the allele weighed on average 1.2 kilograms (2.6 lb) more than people with no copies. Carriers of two copies (16% of the subjects) weighed 3 kilograms (6.6 lb) more and had a 1.67-fold higher rate of obesity than those with no copies. The association was observed in ages 7 and upwards. This gene is not directly associated with diabetes; however, increased body-fat also increases the risk of developing type 2 diabetes.

Simultaneously, a study of 2,900 affected individuals and 5,100 controls of French descent, together with 500 trios (confirming an association independent of population stratification) found association of SNPs in the very same region of FTO (rs1421085). The authors found that this variation, or a variation in strong LD with this variation explains 1% of the population BMI variance and 22% of the population attributable risk of obesity. The authors of this study claim that while obesity was already known to have a genetic component (from twin studies), no replicated previous study has ever identified an obesity risk allele that was so common in the human population. The risk allele is a cluster of 10 single nucleotide polymorphism in the first intron of FTO called rs9939609. According to HapMap, it has population frequencies of 45% in the West/Central Europeans, 52% in Yorubans (West African natives) and 14% in Chinese/Japanese. Furthermore, morbid obesity is associated with a combination of FTO and INSIG2 single nucleotide polymorphisms.

In 2009, variants in the FTO gene were further confirmed to associate with obesity in two very large genome wide association studies of body mass index (BMI).

In adult humans, it was shown that adults bearing the at risk AT and AA alleles at rs9939609 consumed between 500 and 1250 kJ more each day than those carrying the protective TT genotype (equivalent to between 125 and 280 kcal per day more intake). The same study showed that there was no impact of the polymorphism on energy expenditure. This finding of an effect of the rs9939609 polymorphism on food intake or satiety has been independently replicated in five subsequent studies (in order of publication). Three of these subsequent studies also measured resting energy expenditure and confirmed the original finding that there is no impact of the polymorphic variation at the rs9939609 locus on energy expenditure. A different study explored the effects of variation in two different SNPs in the FTO gene (rs17817449 and rs1421085) and suggested there might be an effect on circulating leptin levels and energy expenditure, but this latter effect disappeared when the expenditure was normalized for differences in body composition. The accumulated data across seven independent studies therefore clearly implicates the FTO gene in humans as having a direct impact on food intake but no effect on energy expenditure.

Human hypothalamic neurons derived from individuals carrying the obesity-risk variation at FTO SNPs rs1421085 or rs8050136 express lower levels of the adjacent gene RPGRIP1L compared to individuals carrying the protective variation. The transcription factor CUX1 binds DNA at rs1421085 or rs8050136 in the presence of the protective variation and promotes RPGRIP1L expression suggesting a potential molecular mechanism by which FTO obesity-associates SNPs alter the expression of nearby genes. Reduced expression of RPGRIP1L in mice results in increased body weight due to increased food intake, with no changes in energy expenditure, in agreement with data accumulated in human studies. RPGRIP1L is a protein found in primary cilia that are cellular organelles important for body weight regulation. Decreased RPGRIP1L expression in the mouse brain, or cells derived from humans, results in lower sensitivity for the hormone leptin that suppresses feeding, as well as alters the morphology of the hypothalamus that controls food consumption. These studies provide a potential mechanism by which obesity-risk variations in FTO SNPs promote increased food intake by influencing the function of genes in the vicinity.

The obesity-associated noncoding region within the FTO gene interacts directly with the promoter of IRX3, a homeobox gene, and IRX5, another homeobox gene. The noncoding region of FTO interacts with the promoters of IRX3 and FTO in human, mouse and zebrafish, and with IRX5. Results suggest that IRX3 and IRX5 are linked with obesity and determine body mass and composition. This is further supported by the fact that obesity-associated single nucleotide polymorphisms, in which cytosine is substituted for thymine, are involved in the expression of IRX3 and IRX5 (not FTO) in human brains. The enhanced expression of IRX3 and IRX5 resulting from this single nucleotide alteration promoted a shift from energy-dissipating beige adipocytes to energy-storing white adipocytes and a subsequent reduction in mitochondrial thermogenesis by a factor of 5. Another study found indications that the FTO allele associated with obesity represses mitochondrial thermogenesis in adipocyte precursor cells in a tissue-autonomous manner, and that there is a pathway for adipocyte thermoregulation which involves the proteine ARID5B, the single-nucleotide variant rs1421085, and the IRX3 and IRX5 genes.

=== Alzheimer's disease ===
Recent studies revealed that carriers of common FTO gene polymorphisms show both a reduction in frontal lobe volume of the brain and an impaired verbal fluency performance. Fittingly, a population-based study from Sweden found that carriers of the FTO rs9939609 A allele have an increased risk for incident Alzheimer disease.

=== Other diseases ===
The presence of the FTO rs9939609 A allele was also found to be positively correlated with other symptoms of the metabolic syndrome, including higher fasting insulin, glucose, and triglycerides, and lower HDL cholesterol. However all these effects appear to be secondary to weight increase since no association was found after correcting for increases in body mass index. Similarly, the association of rs11076008 G allele with the increased risk for degenerative disc disease was reported.

== Origin of name ==
By exon trapping, Peters et al. (1999) cloned a novel gene from a region of several hundred kb deleted by the mouse 'fused toes' (FT) mutation. They named the gene 'fatso' (Fto) due to its large size.
