= Methylated-DNA—(protein)-cysteine S-methyltransferase =

methylated-DNA-[protein]-cysteine S-methyltransferase

Identifiers
- EC no.: 2.1.1.63
- CAS no.: 77271-19-3

Databases
- IntEnz: IntEnz view
- BRENDA: BRENDA entry
- ExPASy: NiceZyme view
- KEGG: KEGG entry
- MetaCyc: metabolic pathway
- PRIAM: profile
- PDB structures: RCSB PDB PDBe PDBsum
- Gene Ontology: AmiGO / QuickGO
Search
- PMC: articles
- PubMed: articles
- NCBI: proteins

In enzymology, a methylated-DNA-[protein]-cysteine S-methyltransferase (EC 2.1.1.63) is an enzyme that catalyzes the chemical reaction

DNA (containing 6-O-methylguanine) + protein L-cysteine $\rightleftharpoons$ DNA (without 6-O-methylguanine) + protein S-methyl-L-cysteine

Thus, the two substrates of this enzyme are DNA containing 6-O-methylguanine and protein L-cysteine, whereas its two products are DNA and protein S-methyl-L-cysteine. The S-methyl-L-cysteine residue irreversibly inactivates the protein, allowing only one transfer for each protein.

This enzyme belongs to the family of transferases, specifically those transferring one-carbon group methyltransferases. The systematic name of this enzyme class is DNA-6-O-methylguanine:[protein]-L-cysteine S-methyltransferase.

== Structural studies ==
As of late 2007, 11 structures have been solved for this class of enzymes, with PDB accession codes 1EH6, 1EH7, 1EH8, 1MGT, 1QNT, 1SFE, 1T38, 1T39, 1WRJ, 1YFH, and 2G7H.
