= Regulon =

Group of independent genes

In molecular genetics, a regulon is a group of genes that are regulated as a unit, generally controlled by the same regulatory gene that expresses a protein acting as a repressor or activator. This terminology is generally, although not exclusively, used in reference to prokaryotes, whose genomes are often organized into operons; the genes contained within a regulon are usually organized into more than one operon at disparate locations on the chromosome. Applied to eukaryotes, the term refers to any group of non-contiguous genes controlled by the same regulatory gene.

A modulon is a set of regulons or operons that are collectively regulated in response to changes in overall conditions or stresses, but may be under the control of different or overlapping regulatory molecules. The term stimulon is sometimes used to refer to the set of genes whose expression responds to specific environmental stimuli.

== Examples ==
Commonly studied regulons in bacteria are those involved in response to stress such as heat shock. The heat shock response in E. coli is regulated by the sigma factor σ32 (RpoH), whose regulon has been characterized as containing at least 89 open reading frames.

Regulons involving virulence factors in pathogenic bacteria are of particular research interest; an often-studied example is the phosphate regulon in E. coli, which couples phosphate homeostasis to pathogenicity through a two-component system. Regulons can sometimes be pathogenicity islands.

The Ada regulon in E. coli is a well-characterized example of a group of genes involved in the adaptive response form of DNA repair.

Quorum sensing behavior in bacteria is a commonly cited example of a modulon or stimulon, though some sources describe this type of intercellular auto-induction as a separate form of regulation.

== Evolution ==
Changes in the regulation of gene networks are a common mechanism for prokaryotic evolution. An example of the effects of different regulatory environments for homologous proteins is the DNA-binding protein OmpR, which is involved in response to osmotic stress in E. coli but is involved in response to acidic environments in the close relative Salmonella Typhimurium.
