= Pho regulon =

Phosphate regulatory mechanism in cells

Regulation of inorganic phosphate within the cellular system.

The Phosphate (Pho) regulon is a regulatory mechanism used for the conservation and management of inorganic phosphate within the cell. It was first discovered in Escherichia coli as an operating system for the bacterial strain, and was later identified in other species. The Pho system is composed of various components including extracellular enzymes and transporters that are capable of phosphate assimilation in addition to extracting inorganic phosphate from organic sources. This is an essential process since phosphate plays an important role in cellular membranes, genetic expression, and metabolism within the cell. Under low nutrient availability, the Pho regulon helps the cell survive and thrive despite a depletion of phosphate within the environment. When this occurs, phosphate starvation-inducible (psi) genes activate other proteins that aid in the transport of inorganic phosphate.

== Function ==
The Pho regulon is controlled by a two-component regulatory system composed of a histidine kinase sensor protein (PhoR) within the inner membrane and a transcriptional response regulator (PhoB/PhoR) on the cytoplasmic side of the membrane. These proteins bind to upstream promoters in the pho regulon in order to induce a general change in gene transcription. This occurs when the cell senses low concentrations of phosphate within its internal environment causing the response regulator to be phosphorylated inducing an overall decrease in gene transcription. This mechanism is ubiquitous within gram-positive, gram-negative, cyanobacteria, yeasts, and archaea.

=== Signal transduction pathway ===
Depletion of inorganic phosphate within the cell is required for activation of the Pho regulon in most prokaryotes. In the most commonly studied bacterium, E. coli, seven total proteins are used to detect intracellular levels of inorganic phosphate along with transfusing that signal appropriately. Of the seven proteins, one is a metal binding protein (PhoU) and four are phosphate-specific transporters (Pst S, Pst C, Pst A, and Pst B). The transcriptional response regulator PhoR activates PhoB when it senses low intracellular inorganic phosphate levels.

=== Alternative phosphate usage ===
Although inorganic phosphate is primarily used in the Pho regulon system, there are several species of bacteria that can utilize varying forms of phosphate. One example is seen in E. coli which can use both inorganic and organic phosphate, as well as naturally occurring or synthetic phosphates (Phn). Several enzymes breakdown the compounds of the alternative phosphates, allowing the organism to use the phosphate via the C-P lyase pathway. Other species of bacteria like Pseudomonas aeruginosa and Salmonella typhimurium use a different pathway called the phosphonatase pathway, whereas the bacterium Enterobacter aerogenes can use either one of the pathways to cleave the C-P bond found in the alternative phosphates.

== Conservation among bacterial species ==
Although the Pho regulon system is most widely studied in Escherichia coli it is found in other bacterial species such as Pseudomonas fluorescens and Bacillus subtilis. In Pseudomonas fluorescens, the transcriptional response regulator (PhoB/PhoR) retain the same function they play in E. coli. Bacillus subtilis also shares some similarities when encountering low intracellular phosphate concentrations. Under phosphate-starved conditions B. subtilis binds its transcription regulator, PhoP and the histidine kinase, PhoR to the Pho-regulon gene which induces a production of teichuronic acid. Furthermore, recent studies have suggested the critical role that techoic acid plays in the cell wall of B. subtilis, by acting as a phosphate reservoir and storing the necessary amount of inorganic phosphate in phosphate-starved conditions.

== The Pho regulon's effect on pathogenesis ==
Because bacteria use the Pho regulon to maintain homeostasis of Pi, it has the added effect of being used to control other genes. Many of the other genes activated or repressed by the Pho regulon cause virulence in bacterial pathogens. Three ways that this regulon effects virulence and pathogenicity are toxin production, biofilm formation, and acid tolerance.

=== Toxin production ===
Pseudomonas aeruginosa is a known opportunistic pathogen. One of its virulence factors is its ability to produce pyocyanin, a toxin released to kill both microbes and mammalian cells alike. The pyocyanin production occurs when activated by PhoB. This implies that P. aeruginosa uses the low Pi as a signal that the host has been damaged and to start producing toxin to improve chances of its survival.

In contrast to P. aeruginosa, Vibrio cholerae has its toxin genes repressed by PhoB. It is thought that PhoB in V. cholerae is activated when Pi is low to prevent the production of toxins. It could be activated by other signals in the environment, but it has been shown that PhoB directly inhibits the toxins production by binding to the tcpPH promoter and stopping the ToxR regulon from being activated. Evidence supporting Pi as the signal is given by how the regulon is not repressed under high Pi conditions. The regulatory cascade is only repressed under low Pi conditions.

=== Biofilm formation ===
Biofilms are a mixture of microorganisms, layered together and usually adhered to a surface. The advantages of a biofilm include resistance to environmental stresses, antibiotics, and the ability to more easily obtain nutrients. PhoB is used to enhance biofilm formation in environments where Pi is not in sufficient supply. This has been shown in multiple microbes including Pseudomonas, V. cholera, and E. coli. This is not always the effect of the Pho regulon as for other species in different environments it is more advantageous to not be in biofilm when Pi is low. In these cases PhoB represses biofilm formation.

=== Acid tolerance ===
E. coli has a protein to protect other periplasmic proteins from low pH environments called the Asr protein. The gene responsible for this protein is PhoB-dependent, and can only be turned on when the Pho regulon is activated by low Pi concentration. Synthesis of the Asr protein imparts acid shock resistance to E. coli enabling it to survive in environments like the stomach which has a low pH. Many acid tolerance genes are induced by more than just the low pH environment and require other environmental signals to be present in order to be activated. These specific nutrients being present or in low concentrations, anaerobiosis, and host-produced factors.
