= AlkB homolog 1, histone H2A dioxygenase =

Protein-coding gene in the species Homo sapiens

ALKBH1

Identifiers
- Aliases: ALKBH1, ABH, ABH1, ALKBH, alkB, hABH, alkB homolog 1, histone H2A dioxygenase
- External IDs: OMIM: 605345; MGI: 2384034; GeneCards: ALKBH1
Enzyme activity
EC #	BRENDA	ExPASy	KEGG	MetaCyc
1.14.11.33	↗	↗	↗	↗
1.14.11.51	↗	↗	↗	↗
4.2.99.18	↗	↗	↗	↗

Gene location (Human)
Chr.	Chromosome 14 (human)
Band	14q24.3	Start	77,672,404 bp
Band	14q24.3	End	77,708,023 bp

Gene location (Mouse)
Chr.	Chromosome 12 (mouse)
Band	12|12 D2	Start	87,472,610 bp
Band	12|12 D2	End	87,490,787 bp
RNA expression pattern
Bgee	Human / Mouse (ortholog); Top expressed in: oocyte; secondary oocyte; testicle; gonad; endothelial cell; right ventricle; cartilage tissue; jejunal mucosa; gastrocnemius muscle; embryo / Top expressed in: Paneth cell; primitive streak; spermatocyte; hand; embryo; tail of embryo; embryo; otic vesicle; genital tubercle; epiblast; More reference expression data
BioGPS	n/a
Gene ontology
Molecular function	methylcytosine dioxygenase activity; dioxygenase activity; metal ion binding; catalytic activity; lyase activity; chemoattractant activity; oxidoreductase activity; ferrous iron binding; tRNA binding; 2-oxoglutarate-dependent dioxygenase activity; DNA-N1-methyladenine dioxygenase activity; tRNA demethylase activity; class I DNA-(apurinic or apyrimidinic site) endonuclease activity; DNA-(apurinic or apyrimidinic site) endonuclease activity
Cellular component	mitochondrion; nucleus
Biological process	negative regulation of neuron apoptotic process; cell differentiation; DNA dealkylation involved in DNA repair; placenta development; neuron migration; in utero embryonic development; cellular response to DNA damage stimulus; oxidative demethylation; developmental growth; regulation of gene expression; RNA repair; DNA demethylation; positive chemotaxis; metabolism; neuron projection development; DNA repair; regulation of translation; tRNA wobble cytosine modification; regulation of translational initiation; regulation of translational elongation; oxidative single-stranded DNA demethylation; regulation of mitochondrial translation; tRNA demethylation
Sources:Amigo / QuickGO
Orthologs
Databases	NCBI: entry; OMA: entry
Species	Human	Mouse
Entrez	8846	211064
Ensembl	ENSG00000100601	ENSMUSG00000079036
UniProt	Q13686	P0CB42
RefSeq (mRNA)	NM_001039506; NM_006020	NM_001102565
RefSeq (protein)	NP_006011	NP_001096035
Location (UCSC)	Chr 14: 77.67 – 77.71 Mb	Chr 12: 87.47 – 87.49 Mb
PubMed search
- Wikidata
View/Edit Human	View/Edit Mouse

AlkB homolog 1, histone H2A dioxygenase is a protein that in humans is encoded by the ALKBH1 gene.

== Function ==
This gene encodes a homolog to the E. coli alkB gene product. The E. coli alkB protein is part of the adaptive response mechanism of DNA alkylation damage repair. It is involved in damage reversal by oxidative demethylation of 1-methyladenine and 3-methylcytosine. [provided by RefSeq, Jul 2008].

== See also ==
- MGMT
