= Iroquois homeobox factor =

Protein family

Iroquois homeobox factors are a family of homeodomain transcription factors that play a role in many developmental processes. The loci were named for the flies carrying mutations in one of these genes, which are devoid of all bristles in the lateral part of the notum, leaving only a median stripe of bristles, similar to the Iroquois tribes which shaved all but a medial stripe of hairs on the head.

Human genes that encode Iroquois homeobox factors include:

- IrxA sub-group: IRX1, IRX2, IRX4
- IrxB sub-group: IRX3, IRX5, IRX6
- Iroquois-like gene: MKX
