= Ada (protein) =

Microbial protein found in Escherichia coli str. K-12 substr. MG1655

Bifunctional transcriptional activator/DNA repair enzyme Ada

Identifiers
- Organism: Escherichia coli
- Symbol: Ada
- UniProt: P06134
Search for
- Structures: Swiss-model
- Domains: InterPro

Ada, also called as O^{6} alkyl guanine transferase I (O^{6} AGT I), is an enzyme induced by treatment of E. coli cells with alkylating agents that mainly cause methylation damage. This phenomenon is called the adaptive response hence the name. Ada transfers the alkyl group from DNA bases and sugar-phosphate backbone to a cysteine residue, inactivating itself. Consequently, it reacts stoichiometrically with its substrate rather than catalytically and is referred to as a suicide enzyme. Methylation of Ada protein converts it into a self transcriptional activator, inducing its own gene expression and the expression of other genes which together with Ada help the cells repair alkylation damage. Ada removes the alkyl group attached to DNA bases like guanine (O^{6}-alkyl guanine) or thymine (O^{4}-alkyl thymine) and to the oxygen of the phosphodiester backbone of the DNA. However, Ada shows greater preference for O^{6}- alkyl guanine compared to either O^{4}-thymine and alkylated phosphotriesters. Ada enzyme has two active sites, one for the alkylated guanines and thymines and the other for alkylated phosphotriesters.

== See also ==
- Ogt
- O-6-methylguanine-DNA methyltransferase
