= Pallas Karting =

Karting track in County Galway, Ireland

- Location: Tynagh, Loughrea, County Galway, Ireland
- Coordinates: 53.1326°N 8.3546°W
- Owner: Michael and Tom Moloney
- Opened: 1997
- Major events: Current: RSA Rally Sprint Championship, National Karting Championship. Past: Irish Rallycross Championship
- Length: 2.200 km (1.367 mi)

The Pallas Karting, Pallas Karting Tynagh is a tarmac karting track near Loughrea, County Galway in Ireland. There is also a track configuration designed for rally and rallycross events.

There are three track configurations: 500m beginners track, a 1500m advanced track, and a 2200m Rally track.

Every year since 1999, Pallas Karting has hosted the National Karting Championships. In recent years, Pallas Karting secured the hosting of Rally Sprint events, and also hosted a round of Irish Rallycross Championship in 2019. Motor clubs such as Galway Motor Club and Ballynasloe Vintage Club have held events in Pallas Karting track. The track is approved by Motorsport Ireland.
