= TRNA (carboxymethyluridine34-5-O)-methyltransferase =

Enzyme

TRNA (carboxymethyluridine^{34}-5-O)-methyltransferase

Identifiers
- EC no.: 2.1.1.229

Databases
- BRENDA: enzyme data
- ExPASy: NiceZyme view
- KEGG: enzyme entry
- MetaCyc: metabolic pathway
- Rhea: reactions
- PDB structures: RCSB PDB PDBe PDBsum
Search
- PMC: articles
- PubMed: articles
- NCBI: proteins

TRNA (carboxymethyluridine^{34}-5-O)-methyltransferase (EC 2.1.1.229, ALKBH8, ABH8, Trm9, tRNA methyltransferase 9) is an enzyme with systematic name S-adenosyl-L-methionine:tRNA (carboxymethyluridine^{34}-5-O)-methyltransferase. This enzyme catalyses the following chemical reaction

S-adenosyl-L-methionine + carboxymethyluridine^{34} in tRNA $\rightleftharpoons$ S-adenosyl-L-homocysteine + 5-(2-methoxy-2-oxoethyl)uridine^{34} in tRNA

The enzyme catalyses the posttranslational modification of uridine residues at the wobble position 34 of the anticodon loop of tRNA.
