= Methylated-DNA–protein-cysteine methyltransferase =

Mammalian protein found in Homo sapiens

MGMT

Identifiers
- Aliases: MGMT, Mgmt, AGT, AI267024, Agat, O-6-methylguanine-DNA methyltransferase
- External IDs: OMIM: 156569; MGI: 96977; GeneCards: MGMT
Available structures
PDB	Ortholog search: PDBe RCSB
PDB	List of PDB id codes 1EH6, 1EH7, 1EH8, 1QNT, 1T38, 1T39, 1YFH
Enzyme activity
EC #	BRENDA	ExPASy	KEGG	MetaCyc
2.1.1.63	↗	↗	↗	↗

Gene location (Human)
Chr.	Chromosome 10 (human)
Band	10q26.3	Start	129,467,190 bp
Band	10q26.3	End	129,770,983 bp

Gene location (Mouse)
Chr.	Chromosome 7 (mouse)
Band	7 F3|7 82.07 cM	Start	136,496,343 bp
Band	7 F3|7 82.07 cM	End	136,731,995 bp
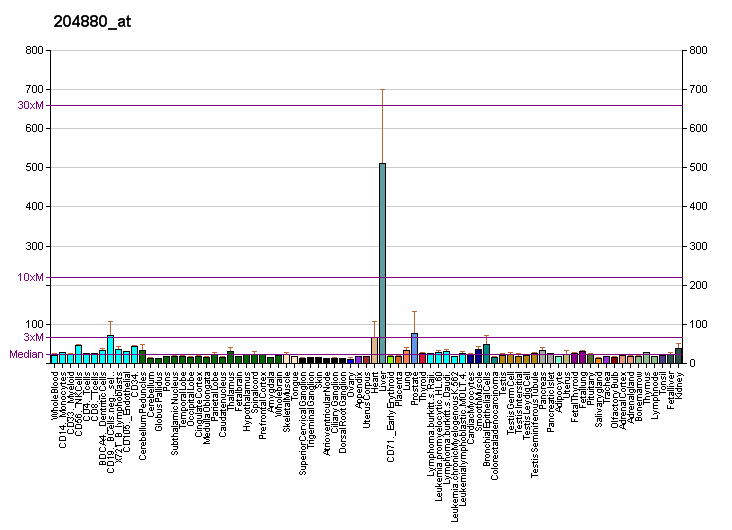
RNA expression pattern
Bgee	Human / Mouse (ortholog); Top expressed in: right lobe of liver; muscle of thigh; right uterine tube; olfactory zone of nasal mucosa; body of stomach; tendon of biceps brachii; body of pancreas; apex of heart; gastric mucosa; gallbladder / Top expressed in: proximal tubule; embryo; right kidney; liver; yolk sac; primary oocyte; left lobe of liver; atrioventricular valve; stomach; white adipose tissue; More reference expression data
BioGPS	More reference expression data
Gene ontology
Molecular function	methyltransferase activity; transferase activity; DNA binding; calcium ion binding; DNA-methyltransferase activity; metal ion binding; catalytic activity; methylated-DNA-[protein-cysteine S-methyltransferase activity]
Cellular component	membrane; nucleoplasm; nucleus
Biological process	response to organic cyclic compound; positive regulation of DNA repair; cellular response to organic cyclic compound; negative regulation of cell death; regulation of cysteine-type endopeptidase activity involved in apoptotic process; mammary gland epithelial cell differentiation; cellular response to DNA damage stimulus; DNA ligation; methylation; cellular response to ionizing radiation; cellular response to oxidative stress; response to folic acid; response to ethanol; response to toxic substance; positive regulation of double-strand break repair; DNA repair; DNA methylation; negative regulation of apoptotic process; DNA dealkylation involved in DNA repair
Sources:Amigo / QuickGO
Orthologs
Databases	NCBI: entry; OMA: entry
Species	Human	Mouse
Entrez	4255	17314
Ensembl	ENSG00000170430	ENSMUSG00000054612
UniProt	P16455	P26187
RefSeq (mRNA)	NM_002412	NM_008598; NM_001377037
RefSeq (protein)	NP_002403	NP_032624; NP_001363966
Location (UCSC)	Chr 10: 129.47 – 129.77 Mb	Chr 7: 136.5 – 136.73 Mb
PubMed search
- Wikidata
View/Edit Human	View/Edit Mouse

Methylated-DNA–protein-cysteine methyltransferase (MGMT), also known as O^{6}-alkylguanine DNA alkyltransferase AGT, is a protein that in humans is encoded by the MGMT gene.

MGMT is crucial for genome stability. It repairs the naturally occurring mutagenic DNA lesion O^{6}-methylguanine back to guanine and prevents mismatch and errors during DNA replication and transcription. Accordingly, loss of MGMT increases the carcinogenic risk in mice after exposure to alkylating agents.

Bacteria also use enzymes of this kind to protect their DNA. In E. coli, there are two versions (isozymes): Ada and Ogt.

== Function and mechanism ==
'O^{6}-alkylguanine DNA alkyltransferase'

Identifiers
- EC no.: 2.1.1.63
- CAS no.: 77271-19-3

Databases
- BRENDA: enzyme data
- ExPASy: NiceZyme view
- KEGG: enzyme entry
- MetaCyc: metabolic pathway
- Rhea: reactions
- PDB structures: RCSB PDB PDBe PDBsum
Search
- PMC: articles
- PubMed: articles
- NCBI: proteins

Although alkylating mutagens preferentially modify the guanine base at the N7 position, O^{6}-alkyl-guanine is a major carcinogenic lesion in DNA. This DNA adduct is removed by the repair protein O^{6}-alkylguanine DNA alkyltransferase through an S_{N}2 mechanism. This protein is not a true enzyme since it removes the alkyl group from the lesion in a stoichiometric reaction and the active enzyme is not regenerated after it is alkylated (referred to as a suicide enzyme). The methyl-acceptor residue in the protein is a cysteine.

$\mathrm{\ \xrightarrow{MGMT} }$

Demethylation of 6-O-methylguanosine to Guanosine

== Clinical significance ==
In patients with glioblastoma, a severe type of brain tumor, the cancer medicine temozolomide is more effective in those with a methylation of the gene's promoter. Overall, MGMT methylation is associated with prolonged patient survival in clinical prediction models. For testing of the MGMT promoter methylation status in the clinical setting, DNA-based methods such as methylation-specific polymerase chain reaction (MS-PCR) or pyrosequencing are preferred over immunohistochemical or RNA- based assays.

In patients with pituitary tumours, MGMT can predict the clinical and radiological response to treatment with temozolomide. In this context the MGMT status is optimally assessed by immunohistochemistry, with MGMT depleted tumours expected to demonstrate a response. Promotor methylation status (of MGMT) does not predict temozolomide response because, in pituitary tumours, the promotor is almost always unmethylated.

MGMT has also been shown to be a useful tool increasing gene therapy efficiency. By using a two component vector consisting of a transgene of interest and MGMT, in vivo drug selection can be utilized to select for successfully transduced cells.

Mutagens in the environment, in tobacco smoke, food, as well as endogenous metabolic products generate reactive electrophilic species that alkylate or specifically methylate DNA, generating 6-O-methylguanine (m6G).

In 1985 Yarosh summarized the early work that established m6G as the alkylated base in DNA that was the most mutagenic and carcinogenic. In 1994 Rasouli-Nia et al. showed that about one mutation was induced for every eight unrepaired m6Gs in DNA. Mutations can cause progression to cancer by a process of natural selection.

=== Expression in cancer ===
Cancers deficient in MGMT
Cancer type	Frequency of deficiency in cancer	Frequency of deficiency in adjacent field defect
Cervical	61%	39%
Colorectal	40%-90%	11%-34%
Colorectal with microsatellite instability	70%	60%
Esophageal adenocarcinoma	71%-79%	89%
Esophageal squamous cell carcinoma	38%-96%	65%
Glioblastoma due to promoter methylation	44%-59%	
Head and neck squamous cell carcinoma	54%	
Hepatocellular carcinoma (hepatitis C virus associated)	68%	65%
Larynx	54%-61%	38%
Stomach	32%-88%	17%-78%
Thyroid	87%	

=== Epigenetic repression ===
Only a minority of sporadic cancers with a DNA repair deficiency have a mutation in a DNA repair gene. However, a majority of sporadic cancers with a DNA repair deficiency do have one or more epigenetic alterations that reduce or silence DNA repair gene expression. For example, in a study of 113 sequential colorectal cancers, only four had a missense mutation in the DNA repair gene MGMT, while the majority had reduced MGMT expression due to methylation of the MGMT promoter region (an epigenetic alteration).

MGMT can be epigenetically repressed in a number of ways. When MGMT expression is repressed in cancers, this is often due to methylation of its promoter region. However, expression can also be repressed by di-methylation of lysine 9 of histone 3 or by over-expression of a number of microRNAs including miR-181d, miR-767-3p and miR-603.

MGMT (O-6-methylguanine-DNA methyltransferase) is an important cancer biomarker because it is involved in the repair of DNA damage and is often silenced or inactivated in cancer cells. The loss of MGMT function leads to a higher rate of mutations, promoting the formation and progression of tumors. The presence or absence of MGMT expression in a cancer sample can indicate a patient's response to alkylating chemotherapy, which is a common treatment for certain types of cancer. Hence, MGMT can be used as a prognostic marker to predict the likelihood of treatment response and to guide the selection of appropriate therapies. A number of point-of-care devices are under development to monitor the methylation status of MGMT.

=== Deficiency in field defects ===
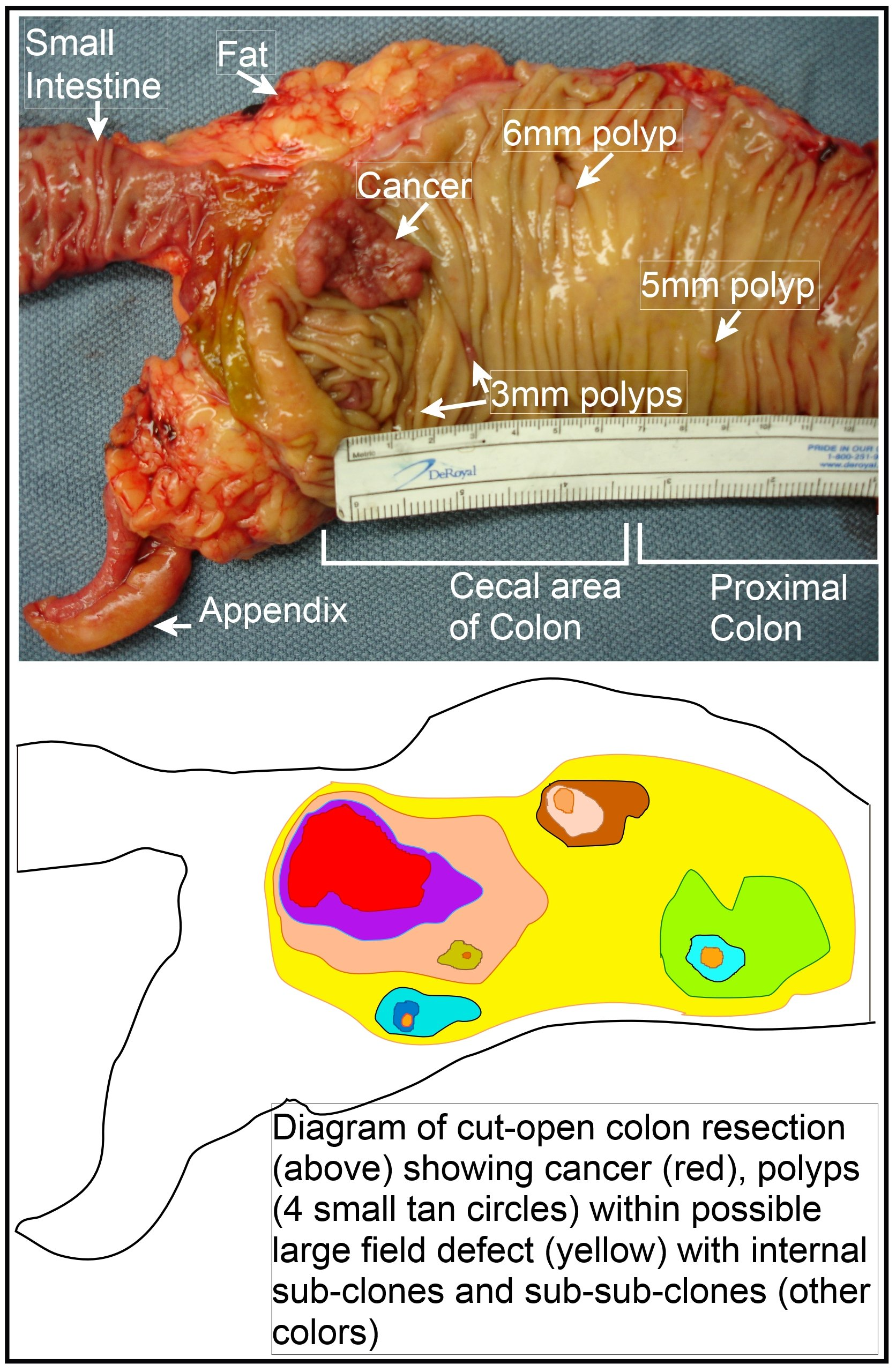
Longitudinally opened freshly resected colon segment showing a cancer and four polyps. Plus a schematic diagram indicating a likely field defect (a region of tissue that precedes and predisposes to the development of cancer) in this colon segment. The diagram indicates sub-clones and sub-sub-clones that were precursors to the tumors.

A field defect is an area or "field" of epithelium that has been preconditioned by epigenetic changes and/or mutations so as to predispose it towards development of cancer. A field defect is illustrated in the photo and diagram shown of a colon segment having a colon cancer and four small polyps within the same area as well. As pointed out by Rubin, "The vast majority of studies in cancer research has been done on well-defined tumors in vivo, or on discrete neoplastic foci in vitro. Yet there is evidence that more than 80% of the somatic mutations found in mutator phenotype human colorectal tumors occur before the onset of terminal clonal expansion." Similarly, Vogelstein et al. point out that more than half of somatic mutations identified in tumors occurred in a pre-neoplastic phase (in a field defect), during growth of apparently normal cells.

In the Table above, MGMT deficiencies were noted in the field defects (histologically normal tissues) surrounding most of the cancers. If MGMT is epigenetically reduced or silenced, it would not likely confer a selective advantage upon a stem cell. However, reduced or absent expression of MGMT would cause increased rates of mutation, and one or more of the mutated genes may provide the cell with a selective advantage. The expression-deficient MGMT gene could then be carried along as a selectively neutral or only slightly deleterious passenger (hitch-hiker) gene when the mutated stem cell generates an expanded clone. The continued presence of a clone with an epigenetically repressed MGMT would continue to generate further mutations, some of which could produce a tumor.

=== Deficiency with exogenous damage ===
MGMT deficiency alone may not be sufficient to cause progression to cancer. Mice with a homozygous mutation in MGMT did not develop more cancers than wild-type mice when grown without stress. However, stressful treatment of mice with azoxymethane and dextran sulphate caused more than four colonic tumors per MGMT mutant mouse, but less than one tumor per wild-type mouse.

=== Repression in coordination with other DNA repair genes ===
In a cancer, multiple DNA repair genes are often found to be simultaneously repressed. In one example, involving MGMT, Jiang et al. conducted a study where they evaluated the mRNA expression of 27 DNA repair genes in 40 astrocytomas compared to normal brain tissues from non-astrocytoma individuals. Among the 27 DNA repair genes evaluated, 13 DNA repair genes, MGMT, NTHL1, OGG1, SMUG1, ERCC1, ERCC2, ERCC3, ERCC4, MLH1, MLH3, RAD50, XRCC4 and XRCC5 were all significantly down-regulated in all three grades (II, III and IV) of astrocytomas. The repression of these 13 genes in lower grade as well as in higher grade astrocytomas suggested that they may be important in early as well as in later stages of astrocytoma. In another example, Kitajima et al. found that immunoreactivity for MGMT and MLH1 expression was closely correlated in 135 specimens of gastric cancer and loss of MGMT and hMLH1 appeared to be synchronously accelerated during tumor progression.

Deficient expression of multiple DNA repair genes are often found in cancers, and may contribute to the thousands of mutations usually found in cancers (see mutation frequencies in cancers).

== Interactions ==
O^{6}-methylguanine-DNA methyltransferase has been shown to interact with estrogen receptor alpha.

== See also ==
- Ada
- ALKBH1
- Ogt
- 6-O-Methylguanine
- DNA methyltransferase
- Methyltransferase
