= AlkB homolog 5, RNA demethylase =

Protein-coding gene in the species Homo sapiens

ALKBH5

Identifiers
- Aliases: ALKBH5, ABH5, OFOXD, OFOXD1, alkB homolog 5, RNA demethylase
- External IDs: OMIM: 613303; MGI: 2144489; GeneCards: ALKBH5
Available structures
PDB	Ortholog search: PDBe RCSB
PDB	List of PDB id codes 4NJ4, 4NRM, 4NRO, 4NRP, 4NRQ, 4O61, 4O7X, 4OCT
Enzyme activity
EC #	BRENDA	ExPASy	KEGG	MetaCyc
1.14.11.53	↗	↗	↗	↗

Gene location (Human)
Chr.	Chromosome 17 (human)
Band	17p11.2|17p11.2	Start	18,183,078 bp
Band	17p11.2|17p11.2	End	18,209,954 bp

Gene location (Mouse)
Chr.	Chromosome 11 (mouse)
Band	11|11 B2	Start	60,427,207 bp
Band	11|11 B2	End	60,449,338 bp
RNA expression pattern
Bgee	Human / Mouse (ortholog); Top expressed in: tibialis anterior muscle; myocardium of left ventricle; cardiac muscle tissue of right atrium; Skeletal muscle tissue of rectus abdominis; gastrocnemius muscle; mucosa of ileum; muscle of thigh; quadriceps femoris muscle; vastus lateralis muscle; secondary oocyte / Top expressed in: retinal pigment epithelium; ciliary body; cumulus cell; vestibular membrane of cochlear duct; Epithelium of choroid plexus; iris; submandibular gland; vestibular sensory epithelium; primary oocyte; parotid gland; More reference expression data
BioGPS	n/a
Gene ontology
Molecular function	2-oxoglutarate-dependent dioxygenase activity; oxidoreductase activity; dioxygenase activity; metal ion binding; oxidative RNA demethylase activity; RNA binding; mRNA N6-methyladenosine dioxygenase activity
Cellular component	nuclear speck; nucleus; nucleoplasm; Golgi apparatus; cytosol
Biological process	oxidative single-stranded RNA demethylation; mRNA processing; cell differentiation; response to hypoxia; mRNA export from nucleus; spermatogenesis; DNA dealkylation involved in DNA repair; regulation of mRNA stability
Sources:Amigo / QuickGO
Orthologs
Databases	NCBI: entry; OMA: entry
Species	Human	Mouse
Entrez	54890	268420
Ensembl	ENSG00000091542	ENSMUSG00000042650
UniProt	Q6P6C2	Q3TSG4
RefSeq (mRNA)	NM_017758	NM_172943
RefSeq (protein)	NP_060228	NP_766531
Location (UCSC)	Chr 17: 18.18 – 18.21 Mb	Chr 11: 60.43 – 60.45 Mb
PubMed search
- Wikidata
View/Edit Human	View/Edit Mouse

RNA demethylase ALKBH5 is a protein that in humans is encoded by the ALKBH5 gene.
