= Irish Rallycross Championship =

- Category: Rallycross
- Country: (Republic of Ireland) Ireland
- Inaugural season: 1982
- Classes: Supercars, Modified, Production, Rallycars, Buggy, Fiesta, Junior
- Drivers' champion: Derek Tohill (2019)
- Official website: Website; Facebook Page

Irish Rallycross Championship, IRX, PartsforCars Irish Rallycross Championship is a Rallycross championship in the Republic of Ireland.

The championship is regulated by Motorsport Ireland who are the governing body of Motorsports in the Republic of Ireland.

== History ==
The Irish Rallycross Championship was formed in 1982, all rounds running in Mondello Park. The event attracted a round of European Rallycross Championship to Ireland in the early 1990s.

== 2022 season ==
With COVID-19 restrictions effectively coming to an end, a full season went ahead in 2022. Championship consisted of 7 rounds, all of them in Mondello Park rallycross circuit.

=== Calendar ===
Round	Track / Event	Date
1	Mondello Park Rallycross	13 February
2	Mondello Park Rallycross	6 March
3-4	Mondello Park Rallycross	4–5 June
5	Mondello Park Rallycross	30 October
6	Mondello Park Rallycross	13 November
7	Mondello Park Rallycross	11 December

=== Results ===
Class	Round 1	Round 2	Round 3	Round 4	Round 5	Round 6	Round 7	2022 Championship
Superfinal	Derek Tohill	Derek Tohill						
Supercar	Derek Tohill	Derek Tohill						
Modified	Philip Kelly	Peter McGarry						
Open Clubman & Fiesta Zetec	Keith Kershawe	Jason McConnon						
Rallycars	Patricia Denning	Shane Mulligan						
Buggy	Padraig Leeson	Conor Shaw						
Autocross	-	-						
Junior	Joshua Power	Joshua Power						

== 2021 season ==
The season started late due to ongoing COVID-19 pandemic. Championship consisted of 5 rounds, all of them in Mondello Park clockwise rallycross circuit.

=== Calendar ===
Round	Track / Event	Date
1	Mondello Park Rallycross	11 July
2	Mondello Park Rallycross	8 August
3	Mondello Park Rallycross	31 October
4	Mondello Park Rallycross	14 November
5	Mondello Park Rallycross	12 December

=== Results ===
Class	Round 1	Round 2	Round 3	Round 4	Round 5	2021 Championship
Superfinal	Derek Tohill	Tommy Graham	Derek Tohill	Derek Tohill	Derek Tohill	Derek Tohill
Supercar	Derek Tohill	Derek Tohill	Derek Tohill	Derek Tohill	Derek Tohill	Derek Tohill
Modified	Alan Crockett	Peter McGarry	Peter McGarry	Philip Kelly	Philip Kelly	?
Production / Open Clubman	Keith Kershawe	-	-	-	Ken Power	-
Rallycars	-	-	-	Thomas O'Rafferty	Keith Power	-
Buggy	Jake O'Sullivan	Jake O'Sullivan	Jake O'Sullivan	Padraig Leeson	Padraic McHale	?
Fiesta Zetec	Michael Ryan	Christopher Grimes Jnr	Michael Ryan	Ben Mullins	Michael Ryan	?
Junior	Loughlin Farrell	Damien Farrell	Loughlin Farrell	Loughlin Farrell	-	Loughlin Farrell
Retro RX	Davy Aiken	-	-	-	-	-

== 2020 season ==
On 12 March all motorsports events were postponed in the light of the coronavirus pandemic. On 20 March, Motorsport Ireland issued a statement that all motorsport events are suspended until 1 June 2020, and later the remainder of the season was cancelled.

=== Calendar ===
Round	Track / Event	Date	
1	Mondello Park Rallycross - Clockwise	8 March	
2	Mondello Park Rallycross	19 April	Cancelled - COVID-19
3-4	Mondello Park Rallycross	18–19 July	Cancelled - COVID-19
5	Mondello Park Rallycross	4 October	Cancelled - COVID-19
6	Mondello Park Rallycross	8 November	Cancelled - COVID-19

=== Results ===
The Rallycars class was absent this season. There were total of 48 cars on the grid for the round 1, with Modified being the largest class - 12 cars. Last year's overall champion Derek Tohill did not start in his Supercar Fiesta, but rather in a 2-wheel drive Fiesta in Modified class, and finished third. Round 1 winner was Tommy Graham. All other rounds were called off and the championship was cancelled.

== 2019 season ==
The official 2019 championship media launch took place on 17 February 2019 in Mondello Park. Leo Nulty started the proceedings, stating that the championship is in its best position in many years. PartsforCars was announced as the main championship sponsor, along with sponsorship from Diamondbrite, IPRS, Rigs 4 Gigs and MRCM Roofing.

Round 1 event on 3 March was cancelled in the afternoon after the first semi-finals race due to adverse weather conditions (snow). However, the results were to stand.

On October 15 Mondello Park have announced that the penultimate two rounds scheduled for 19-20 of October will not take place because participant entry numbers are too low for the championship event to go ahead. The entrant numbers have been dropping throughout the season despite organizers' efforts to revive the championship. The Motorsport Ireland Rallycross Commission met the following week in order to make a decision in relation to the final event of the season on 24 November. On 7 November Motorsport Ireland announced that the last round of the season will go ahead, incentivized by lowered entry fees, and the first time ever “race into the night” as the finals would run under floodlights.

=== Calendar ===
Round	Track / Event	Date	
1	Mondello Park Short Circuit Rallycross	3 March 2019	Event cancelled mid-way, but results stand
2	Pallas Karting Track - Rallycross @ Tynagh	7 April 2019	
3	Mondello Park Reverse Short Circuit Rallycross	19 May 2019	
4	Mondello Park Modified Reverse Short Circuit Rallycross - "Retro Mania"	20–21 July 2019	
5-6	Mondello Park Short Circuit Rallycross	19–20 October 2019	Event did not go ahead, numbers too low
7	Mondello Park Short Circuit Rallycross	24 November 2019	

=== Results ===
The Production Class featured three cars in Round 1, one car in Round 2 and none from Rounds 3 onwards.

Class	Round 1	Round 2	Round 3	Round 4	Round 5-6	Round 7	2019 Championship
Superfinal	Derek Tohill	Noel Greene	Derek Tohill	Derek Tohill	Cancelled	Derek Tohill	Derek Tohill
Supercar	Derek Tohill	Noel Greene	Derek Tohill	Derek Tohill	Cancelled	Derek Tohill	Derek Tohill
Modified	Michael Coyne	Willie Coyne	Peter McGarry	Padraig Leeson	Cancelled	Willie Coyne	Willie Coyne
Production	-	David Gibb	-	-	Cancelled	-	-
Rallycars	Thomas O'Rafferty	David James	Thomas O'Rafferty	Patricia Denning	Cancelled	Shane Stanley	Thomas O'Rafferty
Buggy	Padraic McHale	Padraic McHale	Russel Woods	Russel Woods	Cancelled	Pat Bellew	Padraic McHale
Fiesta	Denis McCrudden	David Maher	David Maher	David Maher	Cancelled	Mark Meenehan	Denis McCrudden
Junior	Jack Byrne	Brendan McCaughan	Jack Byrne	Brendan McCaughan	Cancelled	Michael Ryan	Jack Byrne
Retro RX	-	-	-	Barry McCardle	Cancelled	David Crockett	Barry McCardle / David Crockett

== 2018 season ==
The season consisted of 6 rounds, 3 different track layouts and 9 main championship classes.

Class	Class Description	Winner	2nd place	3rd place
Superfinal		Derek Tohill	Pearse Browne	Michael Coyne
Supercar	Modified 4WD cars with unlimited capacity	Derek Tohill	Michael Coyne	Declan Kelly
Super Modified		Peter McGarry	Michael Coyne	Lloyd Spendlove
3A Modified	Modified 2WD cars with forced induction and Modified 2WD, normally aspirated cars with engine capacity exceeding 2150cc	Peter McGarry	Michael Coyne	Lloyd Spendlove
3B Modified	Modified 2WD, normally aspirated cars with engine capacity up to 2150cc	Chris Grimes	Willie Coyne	David Aitken
Super 1600	Modified 2WD, normally aspirated cars with engine capacity up to 1650cc	Kieran Curran; Andrew Twomey		
16V Production	Standard 2WD normally aspirated cars up to 1650cc and standard 2wd normally aspirated production cars from 1650cc up to 2050cc	Ciaran Murphy	Derek Lenehan	Damien Farrell
Rallycar Class 9	Rallycars up to 1650cc	Patrica Denning		
Rallycar 9A	Rallycars over 1650cc up to 2050cc	Jack Deegan	David Griffin	Jason Keogh
Rallycar 9B	Rallycars over 2050cc, 4WD Cars and Turbo Charged Cars	Joe Downey	Peter O'Brien	PJ Doyle
Buggy		Russell Woods	Owen Skelly	Robbie Allen
Zetec	as per Motorsport Ireland yearbook appendix 48	David Maher	Denis McCrudden	Brian Matthews
Junior	14-16 year olds driving standard 1 litre cars	Jack Byrne	Conor Kehoe	Michael Ryan

=== Sponsors ===
PartsforCars has renewed the main sponsorship for another year. PartsforCars were joined by new sponsors Diamondbrite, IPRS ltd, Morris Roofing & Cladding Maintenance and Rigs 4 Gigs.
