= AGT II =

Microbial protein found in Escherichia coli str. K-12 substr. MG1655

Methylated-DNA--protein-cysteine methyltransferase

Identifiers
- Organism: Escherichia coli
- Symbol: ogt
- UniProt: P0AFH0
Search for
- Structures: Swiss-model
- Domains: InterPro

O^{6}-alkylguanine DNA alkyltransferase II (O^{6} AGT II) previously known as O^{6} Guanine transferase (ogt) is an E. coli protein that is involved in DNA repair together with Ada ( also known as O^{6} AGT I).

Like AGT I, AGT II is responsible for the removal of alkyl groups from O^{6}-alkyl guanine, O^{4}-alkyl thymine and alkyl phosphotriester in the sugar-phosphate backbone of DNA. AGT II shows a greater preference for O^{4}-alkyl thymine than O^{6}-alkyl guanine and alkyl phosphotriester.

Unlike Ada, AGT II is expressed constitutively in cells. Therefore, AGT II will repair alkylated DNA adducts even before Ada is fully induced. AGT II is similar to Ada in its suicide inactivation in that AGT II transfers the alkyl group to a cysteine residue in its own structure, thereby inactivating itself. The human equivalent of AGT II is O^{6}-alkylguanine DNA alkyltransferase, a protein that in humans is encoded by the O^{6}-methylguanine DNA methyltransferase (MGMT) gene. In humans, O^{6}-alkylguanine DNA alkyltransferase preferentially removes alkyl groups from O^{6}-alkyl guanine rather than from O^{6}–alkyl thymine.
