= IRX6 =

Protein-coding gene in the species Homo sapiens

Identifiers
- Aliases: IRX6, IRX-3, IRX7, IRXB3, iroquois homeobox 6
- External IDs: OMIM: 606196; MGI: 1927642; GeneCards: IRX6

Gene location (Human)
Chr.	Chromosome 16 (human)
Band	16q12.2	Start	55,324,203 bp
Band	16q12.2	End	55,330,756 bp

Gene location (Mouse)
Chr.	Chromosome 8 (mouse)
Band	8 C5|8 44.99 cM	Start	93,400,916 bp
Band	8 C5|8 44.99 cM	End	93,407,584 bp
RNA expression pattern
Bgee	Human / Mouse (ortholog); Top expressed in: apex of heart; skin of abdomen; muscle of thigh; skin of leg; subcutaneous adipose tissue; left ventricle; lactiferous gland; gastrocnemius muscle; skeletal muscle tissue; salivary gland / Top expressed in: endocardium of ventricle; urethra; male urethra; endocardium of atrium; embryo; neural layer of retina; greater petrosal nerve; extraocular muscle; genital tubercle; vestibular membrane of cochlear duct; More reference expression data
BioGPS	n/a
Gene ontology
Molecular function	sequence-specific DNA binding; DNA binding; DNA-binding transcription factor activity, RNA polymerase II-specific
Cellular component	nucleus
Biological process	regulation of transcription, DNA-templated; regulation of transcription by RNA polymerase II
Sources:Amigo / QuickGO
Orthologs
Databases	NCBI: entry; OMA: entry
Species	Human	Mouse
Entrez	79190	64379
Ensembl	ENSG00000159387	ENSMUSG00000031738
UniProt	P78412	Q9ER75
RefSeq (mRNA)	NM_024335	NM_001301137; NM_022428
RefSeq (protein)	NP_077311	NP_001288066; NP_071873
Location (UCSC)	Chr 16: 55.32 – 55.33 Mb	Chr 8: 93.4 – 93.41 Mb
PubMed search
- Wikidata
View/Edit Human	View/Edit Mouse

Iroquois-class homeodomain protein IRX-6, also known as Iroquois homeobox protein 6, is a protein that in humans is encoded by the IRX6 gene.

== Function ==
IRX6 is a member of the Iroquois homeobox gene family. Members of this family appear to play multiple roles during pattern formation of vertebrate embryos.
