= IRX3 =

Protein-coding gene in the species Homo sapiens

Identifiers
- Aliases: IRX3, IRX-1, IRXB1, iroquois homeobox 3
- External IDs: OMIM: 612985; MGI: 1197522; GeneCards: IRX3

Gene location (Human)
Chr.	Chromosome 16 (human)
Band	16q12.2	Start	54,283,304 bp
Band	16q12.2	End	54,286,787 bp

Gene location (Mouse)
Chr.	Chromosome 8 (mouse)
Band	8 C5|8 44.55 cM	Start	92,525,153 bp
Band	8 C5|8 44.55 cM	End	92,528,695 bp
RNA expression pattern
Bgee	Human / Mouse (ortholog); Top expressed in: nipple; human penis; skin of arm; myocardium of left ventricle; bronchial epithelial cell; vulva; epithelium of lactiferous gland; lactiferous duct; trachea; gingival epithelium / Top expressed in: lacrimal gland; left lung lobe; maxillary prominence; calvaria; abdominal wall; vestibular membrane of cochlear duct; lactiferous gland; right lung; right lung lobe; right ventricle; More reference expression data
BioGPS	n/a
Gene ontology
Molecular function	sequence-specific DNA binding; DNA binding; DNA-binding transcription factor activity, RNA polymerase II-specific
Cellular component	cytoplasm; axon; nucleus
Biological process	multicellular organism development; mesoderm development; specification of loop of Henle identity; metanephros development; regulation of transcription, DNA-templated; negative regulation of neuron differentiation; positive regulation of neuron differentiation; transcription, DNA-templated; proximal/distal pattern formation involved in nephron development; regulation of transcription by RNA polymerase II; energy homeostasis
Sources:Amigo / QuickGO
Orthologs
Databases	NCBI: entry; OMA: entry
Species	Human	Mouse
Entrez	79191	16373
Ensembl	ENSG00000177508	ENSMUSG00000031734
UniProt	P78415	P81067
RefSeq (mRNA)	NM_024336	NM_001253822; NM_008393
RefSeq (protein)	NP_077312	NP_001240751; NP_032419
Location (UCSC)	Chr 16: 54.28 – 54.29 Mb	Chr 8: 92.53 – 92.53 Mb
PubMed search
- Wikidata
View/Edit Human	View/Edit Mouse

Iroquois-class homeodomain protein IRX-3, also known as Iroquois homeobox protein 3, is a protein that in humans is encoded by the IRX3 gene.

== Discovery and name ==
The Iroquois family of genes was discovered in Drosophila during a mutagenesis experiment designed to identify genes that affected the development of external sensory organs. When genes of this family were knocked out, the Drosophila flies expressed a unique patterning of bristles reminiscent of Iroquois American Indians, they were subsequently named after them. The molecular characteristics of these genes allowed the identification of homologs in C. elegans and several other vertebrates.

== Function ==
IRX3 is a member of the Iroquois homeobox gene family and plays a role in an early step of neural development. Members of this family appear to play multiple roles during pattern formation of vertebrate embryos. Specifically, IRX3 contributes to pattern formation in the spinal cord where it translates a morphogen gradient into transcriptional events, and is directly regulated by NKX2-2. The Irx3 gene controls the subdivision of the neural territory by working together with various other homeodomain factors, all of these factors are expressed in partially overlapping domains along the dorsoventral axis in response to Sonic hedgehog molecules emanating from the floor plate. The combination of these signals defines five regions, each of which will give rise to five types of neurons (V0, V1, V2, MN, and V3). For example, the region that generates V2 neurons expresses both Irx3 and Nkx6.1, while that which forms MN neurons expresses Nkx6.1 alone. Irx3 overexpression in the MN domain transforms MN into V2 neurons.

Irx3 is also expressed in the ventricles of the heart, where it regulates the postnatal maturation and electrophysiological function of the ventricular conduction system (VCS). Embryonically, it is expressed in ventricular trabeculae (which develop into Purkinje fibers of the VCS), and its expression is restricted to the VCS in the mature heart. Its function is required for the rapid conduction characteristic of VCS components, and this is achieved by its indirect activation of Gja5-encoded Connexin-40, the major gap junction that facilitates rapid electrical propagation, and repression of Gja1-encoded Connexin-43. In the absence of Irx3, mice exhibit abnormal cardiac electrophysiology (prolonged QRS duration, notch in the R wave). Additionally, IRX3 is associated with conduction defects in humans, such as Brugada syndrome and bundle branch block (which is also observed in Irx3^{-/-} mice).

== Clinical significance ==
=== Association with obesity ===
Obesity-associated noncoding sequences within FTO interact with the promoter of IRX3 and FTO in human, mouse, and zebrafish. Obesity-associated single nucleotide polymorphisms are related to the expression of IRX3 (not FTO) in the human brain. A direct connection between the expression of IRX3 and body mass and composition was shown through the decrease in body weight of 25-30% in IRX3-deficient mice. This suggests that IRX3 influences obesity. Manipulation of IRX3 and IRX5 pathways has also been shown to decrease obesity markers in human cell cultures. Genetic variants of FTO and IRX3 genes are in high linkage disequilibrium and are associated with obesity risk.

=== Aberrant expression in acute leukaemia ===
IRX3 is aberrantly expressed in ~20% of B-ALL, ~30% of AML, and ~50% of T-ALL. Expression of IRX3 alone is able to immortalise hematopoetic stem and progenitor cells (HSPCs) in myeloid culture and induce lymphoid leukemias in vivo. Focal deletions of FTO intron 8 occur in ~2% of adult and ~6% of paediatric T-ALL patients, resulting in aberrant IRX3 expression. Usually the proximal promoter of IRX3 is bound to FTO intron 8 forming a long-range 'promoter tether' that suppresses IRX3 expression. Recurrent deletions of this 'promoter tether' enables hijack of a distal developmental super-enhancer causing IRX3 expression. In AML, FTO intron 8 is also the location of a cis-regulatory module consisting of clustered enhancer elements and a long non-coding RNA which regulates IRX3 expression and impedes myeloid differentiation. Together, these findings add to the complex regulatory relationship between the FTO and IRX3 genes
