= IRX4 =

Protein-coding gene in the species Homo sapiens

Identifiers
- Aliases: IRX4, IRXA3, iroquois homeobox 4
- External IDs: OMIM: 606199; MGI: 1355275; GeneCards: IRX4

Gene location (Human)
Chr.	Chromosome 5 (human)
Band	5p15.33	Start	1,877,413 bp
Band	5p15.33	End	1,887,236 bp

Gene location (Mouse)
Chr.	Chromosome 13 (mouse)
Band	13|13 C1	Start	73,408,598 bp
Band	13|13 C1	End	73,417,727 bp
RNA expression pattern
Bgee	Human / Mouse (ortholog); Top expressed in: skin of abdomen; apex of heart; skin of leg; hair follicle; gonad; left ventricle; minor salivary glands; vagina; right ventricle; epithelium of lactiferous gland / Top expressed in: lip; ventricle of the heart; atrioventricular canal; endocardial cushion; myocardium of ventricle; cardiac muscles; right ventricle; atrioventricular valve; primordial ventricle; upper lip; More reference expression data
BioGPS	n/a
Gene ontology
Molecular function	sequence-specific DNA binding; DNA binding; DNA-binding transcription factor activity, RNA polymerase II-specific
Cellular component	nucleus
Biological process	development of the heart; regulation of transcription, DNA-templated; establishment of animal organ orientation; regulation of transcription by RNA polymerase II
Sources:Amigo / QuickGO
Orthologs
Databases	NCBI: entry; OMA: entry
Species	Human	Mouse
Entrez	50805	50916
Ensembl	ENSG00000113430	ENSMUSG00000021604
UniProt	P78413	Q9QY61
RefSeq (mRNA)	NM_016358; NM_001278632; NM_001278633; NM_001278634; NM_001278635	NM_018885
RefSeq (protein)	NP_001265561; NP_001265562; NP_001265563; NP_001265564; NP_057442	NP_061373
Location (UCSC)	Chr 5: 1.88 – 1.89 Mb	Chr 13: 73.41 – 73.42 Mb
PubMed search
- Wikidata
View/Edit Human	View/Edit Mouse

Iroquois-class homeodomain protein IRX-4, also known as Iroquois homeobox protein 4, is a protein that in humans is encoded by the IRX4 gene.

== Function ==
IRX4 is a member of the Iroquois homeobox gene family. Members of this family appear to play multiple roles during pattern formation of vertebrate embryos.
