= IRX2 =

Protein-coding gene in the species Homo sapiens

Identifiers
- Aliases: IRX2, IRXA2, iroquois homeobox 2
- External IDs: OMIM: 606198; MGI: 1197526; GeneCards: IRX2

Gene location (Human)
Chr.	Chromosome 5 (human)
Band	5p15.33	Start	2,745,845 bp
Band	5p15.33	End	2,751,677 bp

Gene location (Mouse)
Chr.	Chromosome 13 (mouse)
Band	13 C1|13 39.23 cM	Start	72,776,939 bp
Band	13 C1|13 39.23 cM	End	72,782,317 bp
RNA expression pattern
Bgee	Human / Mouse (ortholog); Top expressed in: skin of arm; lower lobe of lung; lactiferous duct; parotid gland; skin of thigh; pons; renal medulla; bronchial epithelial cell; nipple; buccal mucosa cell / Top expressed in: pretectal area; otic placode; lip; otic vesicle; saccule; lacrimal gland; epidermis; zone of skin; skin of abdomen; skin of back; More reference expression data
BioGPS	n/a
Gene ontology
Molecular function	DNA binding; DNA-binding transcription repressor activity, RNA polymerase II-specific; sequence-specific DNA binding; DNA-binding transcription factor activity, RNA polymerase II-specific
Cellular component	nucleus
Biological process	specification of loop of Henle identity; metanephros development; regulation of transcription, DNA-templated; proximal/distal pattern formation involved in metanephric nephron development; negative regulation of transcription by RNA polymerase II
Sources:Amigo / QuickGO
Orthologs
Databases	NCBI: entry; OMA: entry
Species	Human	Mouse
Entrez	153572	16372
Ensembl	ENSG00000170561	ENSMUSG00000001504
UniProt	Q9BZI1	P81066
RefSeq (mRNA)	NM_001134222; NM_033267	NM_010574
RefSeq (protein)	NP_001127694; NP_150366	NP_034704
Location (UCSC)	Chr 5: 2.75 – 2.75 Mb	Chr 13: 72.78 – 72.78 Mb
PubMed search
- Wikidata
View/Edit Human	View/Edit Mouse

Iroquois-class homeodomain protein IRX-2, also known as Iroquois homeobox protein 2, is a protein that in humans is encoded by the IRX2 gene.

== Function ==
IRX2 is a member of the Iroquois homeobox gene family. Members of this family appear to play multiple roles during pattern formation of vertebrate embryos.

== Cancer ==
IRX2 gene has been observed progressively downregulated in Human papillomavirus-positive neoplastic keratinocytes derived from uterine cervical preneoplastic lesions at different levels of malignancy. For this reason, IRX2 is likely to be associated with tumorigenesis and may be a potential prognostic marker for uterine cervical preneoplastic lesions progression.
