= Adaptive response =

Bacterial DNA damage response pathway

The adaptive response to methylation damage (or the Ada response) is a bacterial DNA damage response pathway induced specifically upon exposure to DNA methylation damage. It is initiated independently of the SOS response. Bacteria such as Escherichia coli exposed to sub-lethal doses of methylation damage activate the Ada response pathway. This enables their survival to subsequent exposure to high doses of the same agent (which are otherwise lethal). The Ada response was first identified in E. coli; however, over the years diverse and widespread Ada response pathways have been identified across bacteria. The pathways typically vary in the domain organization of the regulatory protein that orchestrates the Ada response.

== Function ==
Environmental influence plays a crucial role in the developmental plasticity of genotypes due to the introduction of DNA-damaging agents. This phenomenon and the defense mechanism that has evolved to protect an organism’s genotype against damage and prevent multiple phenotypes is known as the adaptive response. Since the adaptive response is able to prevent the possibility of different phenotypes it, therefore, allows organisms to minimize the stress effects it experiences from different stressors and eventually develop a resistance to the stressors. The effects of various chemical, biological, and physical genotoxic damaging agents jeopardize the genotypic integrity of all organisms; however, many evolutionary defense mechanisms have developed so that the stressors stimulate the adaptive response to reduce the stress to a more reasonable and manageable level and reduce genetic damage.

Many of these defense mechanisms have contributed to the nonspecific adaptive response by "conditioning" the effected organisms with small amounts of particular stressors to stimulate cellular conformation changes and increase the resistance when the organism is exposed to higher concentrations of that particular stressor. For example, the decomposition of water produces highly reactive hydroxyl free radicals that can damage DNA, therefore, stimulating DNA repair mechanisms. This DNA up-regulation is involved in the adaptive response because the organism is being conditioned to protect itself against these stressors. Reactive oxygen species (ROS) are very damaging to DNA and highly associated with the adaptive response. When free radicals attack the important biomolecules that makeup organisms, harmful molecular intermediates react with and damage DNA leading to base damage or breaks in the dsDNA strand. The adaptive response is helpful to prevent damage and maintain the integrity of the genome.

== The E. coli Ada response ==
This response was first identified in E. coli. The E. coli adaptive response constitutes four genes: ada, alkA, alkB, and aidB, each one working in specific residues, all regulated by the E. coli Ada protein.

The E. coli adaptive response is mediated by the Ada protein, which covalently transfers methylation damage from DNA to one of its two active methyl acceptor cysteine residues: Cys38 and Cys321. The Ada protein can repair damage by transferring methyl groups from O6-methylguanine or O4-methylthymine to Cys321 and also from methylphosphotriesters to Cys38 residue through an irreversible process. It can also convert the protein from a weak to a strong activator of transcription, increasing alkylation repair activity.

=== Ada ===
The ada gene has regulatory and repair activities, both really close to each other. For the regulation to occur, the ada protein must be activated, which is a consequence of the DNA repair activity.

=== alkA ===
The alkA gene product is a glycosylase that can repair a variety of lesions, removing a base from the sugar-phosphate backbone, producing an abasic site.

=== aidB ===
The aidB product is a flavin-containing protein.

=== alkB ===
alkB is an iron-dependent oxidoreductase, and it is associated with DNA repair because this gene is able to repair lesions in phage DNA prior to infection. It has been also demonstrated that alkB is required for reactivation of MMS-treated (methylating agent methyl methanesulfonate) single-stranded phage and since there are no lesions to be removed, it has been suggested that alkBB is involved in replication of damaged template DNA. Also, the fact that alkB can confer resistance to a methylating agent it suggests that it functions by itself.

== Mechanism ==
Although little is known about the mechanism of the adaptive response, it is believed that changes in gene transcription and the activation of cellular defenses are involved. It has recently been suggested that specific mechanistic pathways of the adaptive response can activate the important tumor suppressor protein p53. A key experiment that reveals the underlying mechanisms is that which involves the treatment with protein synthesis inhibitors to Oedogonium Chlamydomonas and Closterium cells. This experiment resulted in DNA-binding proteins being synthesized in the cells conditioned with the stressor. Furthermore, reverse adaptive response suggests that a high conditioning dose followed by a second low dose produces roughly the same magnitude of response. This could suggest that the mechanisms work by cellular response modulation, not prevention, to the impending damage. The adaptive response is not instantaneous and takes several hours to develop, however after development it can last for months given that the stressor exposure is limited and will not overwhelm the cell. This is known as being dose and time-dependent with a maximum response occurring at 4 hours after an initial conditioning dose of 100 cGy (centigray) radiation stressor.
