= 6-O-Methylguanine =

Names
- Preferred IUPAC name 6-Methoxy-9H-purin-2-amine
- Other names 6-Methoxyguanine; O^{6}-Methylguanine; 2-Amino-6-methoxypurine

Identifiers
CAS Number	20535-83-5
3D model (JSmol)	Interactive image
ChEMBL	ChEMBL226395
ChemSpider	58766
ECHA InfoCard	100.111.933
PubChem CID	65275
UNII	9B710FV2AE
CompTox Dashboard (EPA)	DTXSID9049405
- InChI: InChI=1S/C6H7N5O/c1-12-5-3-4(9-2-8-3)10-6(7)11-5/h2H,1H3,(H3,7,8,9,10,11) Key: BXJHWYVXLGLDMZ-UHFFFAOYSA-N; InChI=1/C6H7N5O/c1-12-5-3-4(9-2-8-3)10-6(7)11-5/h2H,1H3,(H3,7,8,9,10,11) Key: BXJHWYVXLGLDMZ-UHFFFAOYAR
- SMILES: COC1=NC(=NC2=C1NC=N2)N

Properties
Chemical formula	C_{6}H_{7}N_{5}O
Molar mass	165.156 g·mol^{−1}
Melting point	>300 °C
- Except where otherwise noted, data are given for materials in their standard state (at 25 °C [77 °F], 100 kPa). verify (what is ?) Infobox references

6-O-Methylguanine is a derivative of the nucleobase guanine in which a methyl group is attached to the oxygen atom. It base-pairs to thymine rather than cytosine, causing a G:C to A:T transition in DNA.

== Formation ==
6-O-Methylguanine is formed in DNA by alkylation of the oxygen atom of guanine, most often by N-nitroso compounds (NOC) and sometimes due to methylation by other compounds such as endogenous S-adenosyl methionine. NOC are alkylating agents formed by the reaction of nitrite or other nitrogen oxides with secondary amines and N-alkylamides, yielding N-alkylnitrosamines and N-alkylnitrosamides.

NOC are found in some foods (bacon, sausages, cheese) and tobacco smoke, and are formed in the gastrointestinal tract, especially after consumption of red meat. In addition, endogenous nitric oxide levels were found to be enhanced under chronic inflammatory conditions, and this could favor NOC formation in the large intestine.

== Repair and carcinogenicity ==
Repair of 6-O-methylguanine in DNA is primarily carried out by O-6-methylguanine-DNA methyltransferase (MGMT). Epigenetic reductions in MGMT expression are one of the most frequent DNA repair defects, associated with carcinogenesis. (Also see MGMT expression in cancer.)

== Mutagenicity ==
In 1985 Yarosh summarized the early work that established 6-O-methylguanine as the alkylated base in DNA that was the most mutagenic and carcinogenic. In 1994 Rasouli-Nia et al. showed that about one mutation was induced for every eight unrepaired 6-O-Methylguanines in DNA.

About one third of the time 6-O-methylguanine mispairs during replication, leading to the incorporation of dTMP rather than dCMP. 6-O-methylguanine is therefore a mutagenic nucleobase. However, the mutagenicity of a particular 6-O-methylguanine base depends on the sequence in which it is embedded.

== Other effects ==
Unrepaired 6-O-methylguanine can also lead to cell cycle arrest, sister chromatid exchange, or apoptosis. These effects are due to interaction of the DNA mismatch repair pathway with 6-O-methylguanine, and also depend on signaling network activation, led by early ATM, H2AX, CHK1 and p53 phosphorylation.

== See also ==
- EMS mutagenesis
- Temozolomide
