= IRX5 =

Protein-coding gene in the species Homo sapiens

Identifiers
- Aliases: IRX5, HMMS, IRX-2a, IRXB2, iroquois homeobox 5
- External IDs: OMIM: 606195; MGI: 1859086; GeneCards: IRX5

Gene location (Human)
Chr.	Chromosome 16 (human)
Band	16q12.2	Start	54,930,865 bp
Band	16q12.2	End	54,934,485 bp

Gene location (Mouse)
Chr.	Chromosome 8 (mouse)
Band	8 C5|8 44.93 cM	Start	93,084,253 bp
Band	8 C5|8 44.93 cM	End	93,102,914 bp
RNA expression pattern
Bgee	Human / Mouse (ortholog); Top expressed in: skin of thigh; bronchial epithelial cell; skin of abdomen; right ventricle; lactiferous duct; skin of hip; parotid gland; muscle of thigh; apex of heart; vulva / Top expressed in: endocardium of atrium; molar; maxillary prominence; endocardium of ventricle; vestibular membrane of cochlear duct; lacrimal gland; Meckel's cartilage; conjunctival fornix; masseter muscle; left lung lobe; More reference expression data
BioGPS	n/a
Gene ontology
Molecular function	sequence-specific DNA binding; DNA binding; vitamin D binding; DNA-binding transcription factor activity, RNA polymerase II-specific
Cellular component	nucleus
Biological process	retinal bipolar neuron differentiation; regulation of gene expression; embryonic cranial skeleton morphogenesis; regulation of transcription, DNA-templated; gonad development; cell development; transcription, DNA-templated; regulation of heart rate; visual perception; neuron maturation; response to stimulus; regulation of transcription by RNA polymerase II
Sources:Amigo / QuickGO
Orthologs
Databases	NCBI: entry; OMA: entry
Species	Human	Mouse
Entrez	10265	54352
Ensembl	ENSG00000176842	ENSMUSG00000031737
UniProt	P78411	Q9JKQ4
RefSeq (mRNA)	NM_001252197; NM_005853	NM_018826
RefSeq (protein)	NP_001239126; NP_005844	NP_061296
Location (UCSC)	Chr 16: 54.93 – 54.93 Mb	Chr 8: 93.08 – 93.1 Mb
PubMed search
- Wikidata
View/Edit Human	View/Edit Mouse

Iroquois-class homeodomain protein IRX-5, also known as Iroquois homeobox protein 5, is a protein that in humans is encoded by the IRX5 gene.

== Function ==
IRX5 is a member of the Iroquois homeobox gene family. Members of this family appear to play multiple roles during pattern formation of vertebrate embryos. First described in a 2012 study by Reversade and colleagues, the loss of IRX5 in humans causes Hamamy Syndrome, a recessive developmental disorder mainly affecting the heart, long bones, and craniofacial structures.
