= 7-Methylguanine =

Names
- IUPAC name 7-Methylguanine
- Preferred IUPAC name 2-Amino-7-methyl-1,7-dihydro-6H-purin-6-one
- Other names N7-Methylguanine; Epiguanine

Identifiers
CAS Number	578-76-7
3D model (JSmol)	Interactive image
Beilstein Reference	174245
ChEBI	CHEBI:2274
ChemSpider	10883
ECHA InfoCard	100.008.575
EC Number	209-431-0
KEGG	C02242
PubChem CID	135398679
UNII	661J4K04NB
CompTox Dashboard (EPA)	DTXSID9020873
- InChI: InChI=1S/C6H7N5O/c1-11-2-8-4-3(11)5(12)10-6(7)9-4/h2H,1H3,(H3,7,9,10,12) Key: FZWGECJQACGGTI-UHFFFAOYSA-N
- SMILES: CN1C=NC2=C1C(=O)N=C(N2)N

Properties
Chemical formula	C_{6}H_{7}N_{5}O
Molar mass	165.156 g·mol^{−1}
- Except where otherwise noted, data are given for materials in their standard state (at 25 °C [77 °F], 100 kPa). verify (what is ?) Infobox references

7-Methylguanine is a modified purine nucleobase. It is a methylated version of guanine. The 7-methylguanine nucleoside is called 7-methylguanosine. However, the free 7-methylguanine base is not involved in the synthesis of nucleotides and not incorporated directly into nucleic acids. 7-Methylguanine is a natural inhibitor of poly (ADP-ribose) polymerase (PARP) and tRNA guanine transglycosylase (TGT) - and thus may exert anticancer activity. For example, it was demonstrated that 7-methylguanine could accelerate apoptotic death of BRCA1-deficient breast cancer cells induced by cisplatin and doxorubicin.
