= Mismatch repair endonuclease PMS2 =

Protein-coding gene in the species Homo sapiens

PMS2
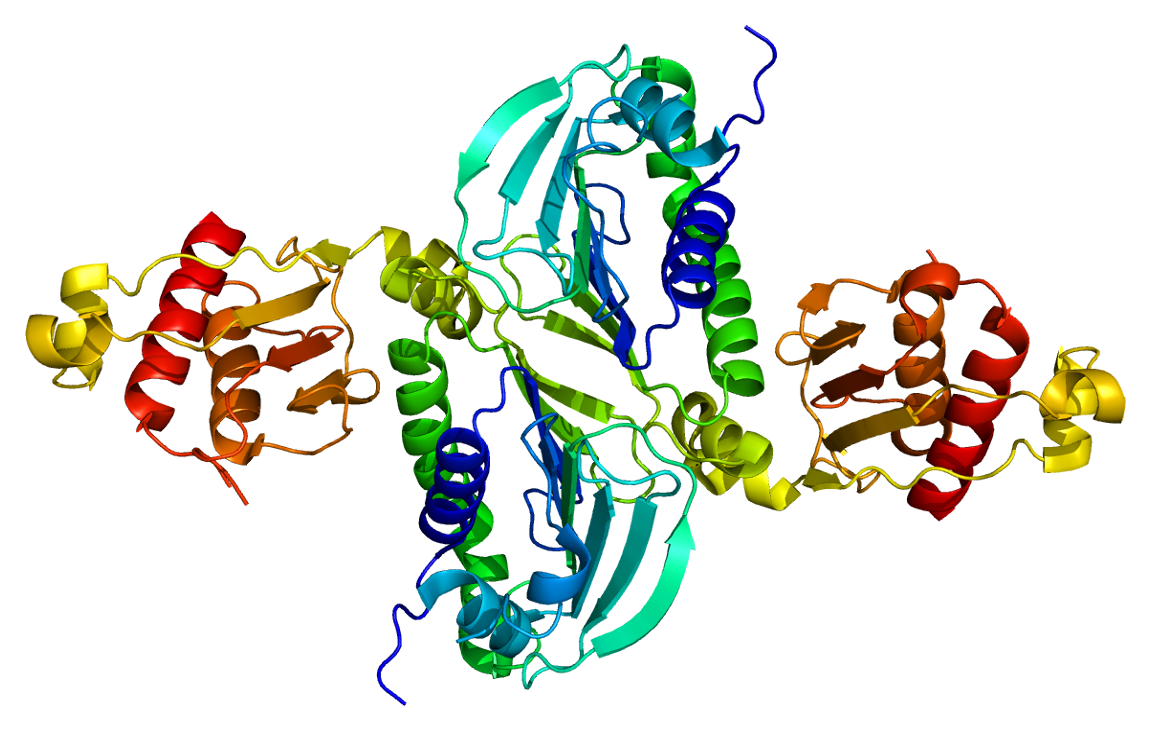

Identifiers
- Aliases: PMS2, HNPCC4, PMS2CL, PMSL2, MLH4, PMS1 homolog 2, mismatch repair system component, MMRCS4, PMS-2
- External IDs: OMIM: 600259; MGI: 104288; GeneCards: PMS2
Available structures
PDB	Ortholog search: PDBe RCSB
PDB	List of PDB id codes 1EA6, 1H7S, 1H7U

Gene location (Human)
Chr.	Chromosome 7 (human)
Band	7p22.1	Start	5,970,925 bp
Band	7p22.1	End	6,009,106 bp
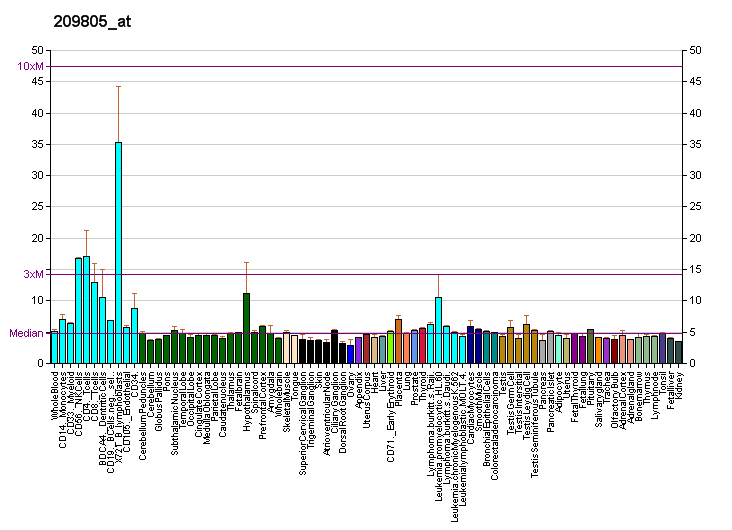
RNA expression pattern
Bgee	Human / Mouse (ortholog); Top expressed in: thymus; prefrontal cortex; testicle; superior frontal gyrus; corpus callosum; endometrium; ventricular zone; stromal cell of endometrium; cerebellar cortex; cerebellar hemisphere / n/a; More reference expression data
BioGPS	More reference expression data
Gene ontology
Molecular function	endonuclease activity; single-stranded DNA binding; ATP binding; mismatched DNA binding; DNA binding; MutSalpha complex binding; nuclease activity; protein binding; single base insertion or deletion binding; hydrolase activity; ATPase activity
Cellular component	nucleus; microtubule cytoskeleton; nucleoplasm; MutLalpha complex; cytosol; plasma membrane; cytoplasmic ribonucleoprotein granule; mismatch repair complex
Biological process	cellular response to DNA damage stimulus; somatic hypermutation of immunoglobulin genes; nucleic acid phosphodiester bond hydrolysis; DNA repair; DNA mismatch repair
Sources:Amigo / QuickGO
Orthologs
Databases	NCBI: entry; OMA: entry
Species	Human	Mouse
Entrez	5395	18861
Ensembl	ENSG00000122512	ENSMUSG00000079109
UniProt	P54278	P54279
RefSeq (mRNA)	NM_000535; NM_001322003; NM_001322004; NM_001322005; NM_001322006 NM_001322007; NM_001322008; NM_001322009; NM_001322010; NM_001322011; NM_001322012; NM_001322013; NM_001322014; NM_001322015	NM_008886
RefSeq (protein)	NP_000526; NP_001308932; NP_001308933; NP_001308934; NP_001308935 NP_001308936; NP_001308937; NP_001308938; NP_001308939; NP_001308940; NP_001308941; NP_001308942; NP_001308943; NP_001308944	n/a
Location (UCSC)	Chr 7: 5.97 – 6.01 Mb	n/a
PubMed search
- Wikidata
View/Edit Human	View/Edit Mouse

Mismatch repair endonuclease PMS2 (postmeiotic segregation increased 2) is an enzyme that in humans is encoded by the PMS2 gene.

== Function ==
This gene is one of the PMS2 gene family members, which are found in clusters on chromosome 7. Human PMS2-related genes are located at bands 7p12, 7p13, 7q11, and 7q22. Exons 1 through 5 of these homologues share high degree of identity to human PMS2 The product of this gene is involved in DNA mismatch repair. The protein forms a heterodimer with MLH1, and this complex interacts with MSH2 bound to mismatched bases. Defects in this gene are associated with hereditary nonpolyposis colorectal cancer, with Turcot syndrome, and are a cause of supratentorial primitive neuroectodermal tumors. Alternatively spliced transcript variants have been observed.

=== Mismatch repair and endonuclease activity ===
PMS2 is involved in mismatch repair and has latent endonuclease activity that depends on the integrity of the meta-binding motif in MutL homologs. As an endonuclease, PMS2 introduces nicks into a discontinuous DNA strand.

== Interactions ==
PMS2 has been shown to interact with MLH1 by forming the heterodimer MutLα. There is competition between MLH3, PMS1, and PMS2 for the interacting domain on MLH1, which is located in residues 492-742.

The interacting domains in PMS2 contain heptad repeats characteristic of leucine zipper proteins. MLH1 interacts with PMS2 at residues 506-756.

The MutS heterodimers, MutSα and MutSβ, associate with MutLα upon mismatch binding. MutLα is believed to join the mismatch recognition step to other processes, including: removal of mismatches from the new DNA strand, resynthesis of the degraded DNA, and repair of the nick in the DNA. MutLα is shown to have weak ATPase activity and also possesses endonuclease activity that introduces nicks into the discontinuous strand of DNA. This facilitates 5' to 3' degradation of the mismatched DNA strand by EXO1. The active site of MutLα is located on the PMS2 subunit. PMS1 and PMS2 compete for interaction with MLH1. Proteins in the interactome of PMS2 have been identified by tandem affinity purification.

Human PMS2 is expressed at very low levels and is not believed to be strongly cell cycle regulated.

=== Interactions involving p53 and p73 ===
PMS2 has also been shown to interact with p53 and p73. In the absence of p53, PMS2-deficient and PMS2-proficient cells are still capable of arresting the cell cycle at the G2/M checkpoint when treated with cisplatin. Cells that are deficient in p53 and PMS2, exhibit increased sensitivity to anticancer agents. PMS2 is a protective mediator of cell survival in p53-deficient cells and modulates protective DNA damage response pathways independently of p53. PMS2 and MLH1 can protect cells from cell death by counteracting p73-mediated apoptosis in a mismatch repair-dependent manner.

PMS2 can interact with p73 to enhance cisplatin-induced apoptosis by stabilizing p73. Cisplatin stimulates the interaction between PMS2 and p73, which is dependent on c-Abl. The MutLα complex may function as an adapter to bring p73 to the site of damaged DNA and also act as an activator of p73, due to the presence of PMS2. It may also be possibly for overexpressed PMS2 to stimulate apoptosis in the absence of MLH1 and in the presence of p73 and cisplatin due to the stabilizing actions of PMS2 on p73. Upon DNA damage, p53 induces cell cycle arrest through the p21/WAF pathway and initiates repair by expression of MLH1 and PMS2. The MSH1/PMS2 complex acts as a sensor of the extent of the damage to the DNA, and initiates apoptosis by stabilizing p73 if the damage is beyond repair. Loss of PMS2 does not always lead to instability of MLH1 since it can also form complexes with MLH3 and PMS1.

== Clinical significance ==
=== Mutations ===
PMS2 is a gene that encodes for DNA repair proteins involved in mismatch repair. The PMS2 gene is located on chromosome 7p22, and it consists of 15 exons. Exon 11 of the PMS2 gene contains an eight-adenosine coding repeat.

Comprehensive genomic profiling of 100,000 human cancer samples revealed that mutations in the PMS2 promoter are significantly associated with high tumor mutational burden (TMB), particularly in melanoma. TMB is a reliable predictor of whether a patient may respond to cancer immunotherapy, where high TMB is associated with more favorable treatment outcomes.

Heterozygous germline mutations in DNA mismatch repair genes like PMS2 lead to autosomal dominant Lynch syndrome. Only 2% of families that have Lynch syndrome have mutations in the PMS2 gene. The age of patients when they first presented with PMS2-associated Lynch syndrome varies greatly, with a reported range of 23 to 77 years.

In rare cases, a homozygous defect may cause this syndrome. In such cases, a child inherits the gene mutation from both parents, and the condition is called Turcot syndrome or Constitutional MMR Deficiency (CMMR-D). Up until 2011, 36 patients with brain tumors due to biallelic PMS2 germline mutations have been reported. Inheritance of Turcot syndrome can be dominant or recessive. Compound heterozygous mutations in PMS2 cause recessive inheritance of Turcot syndrome. 31 out of 57 families reported with CMMR-D have germline PMS2 mutations. 19 out of 60 PMS2 homozygous or compound heterozygous mutation carriers had gastrointestinal cancer or adenomas as the first manifestation of CMMR-D. Presence of pseudogenes can confuse when identifying mutations in PMS2, leading to false positive conclusions of the presence of mutated PMS2.

=== Deficiency and overexpression ===
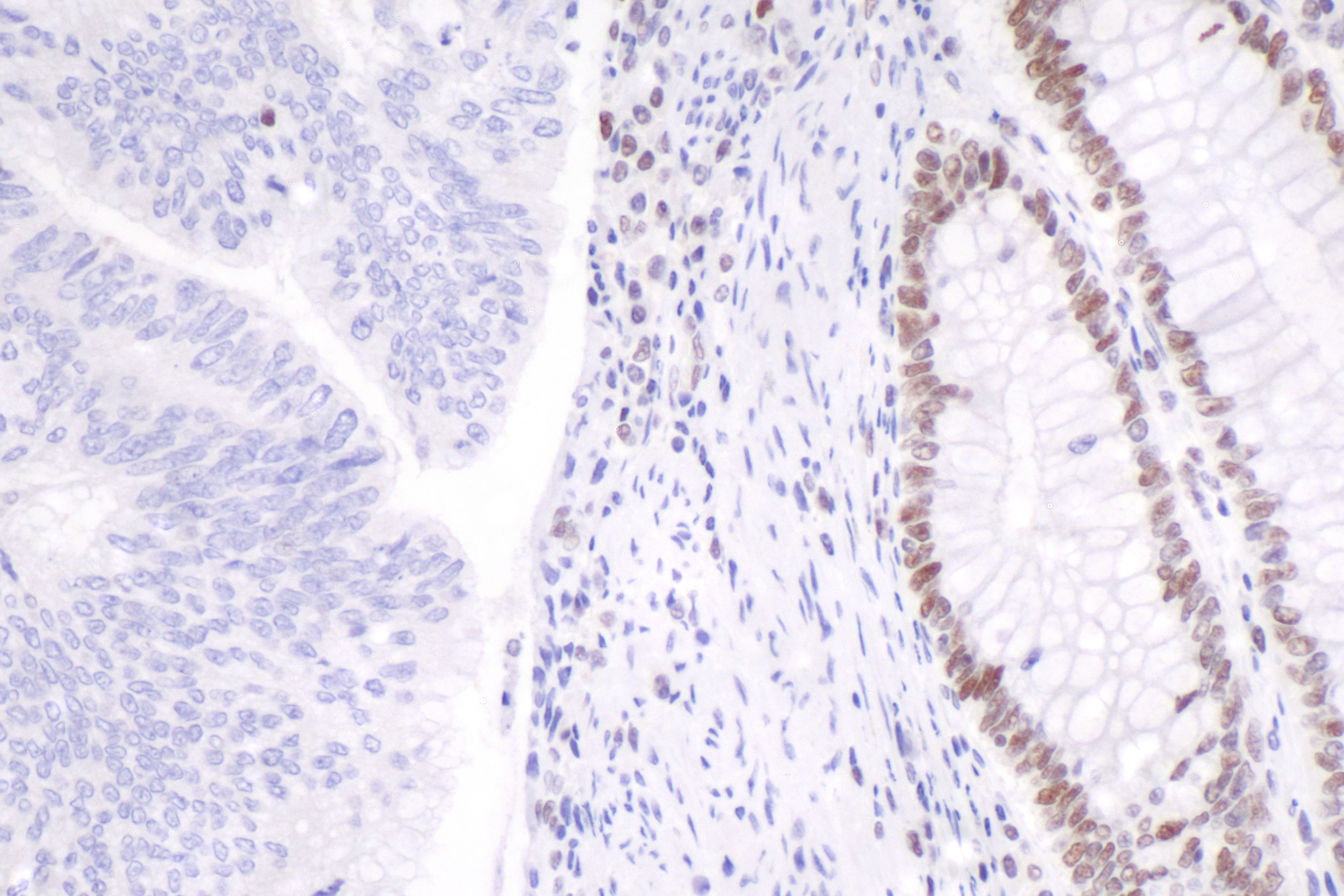
Micrograph showing loss of staining for PMS2 in colorectal adenocarcinoma in keeping with DNA mismatch repair (left of image) and benign colorectal mucosa (right of image)

Overexpression of PMS2 results in hypermutability and DNA damage tolerance. Deficiency of PMS2 also contributes to genetic instability by allowing for mutations to propagate due to reduced MMR function. It has been shown that PMS2-/- mice developed lymphomas and sarcomas. It was also shown that male mice that are PMS2-/- are sterile, indicating that PMS2 may have a role in spermatogenesis.

=== Role in normal colon ===
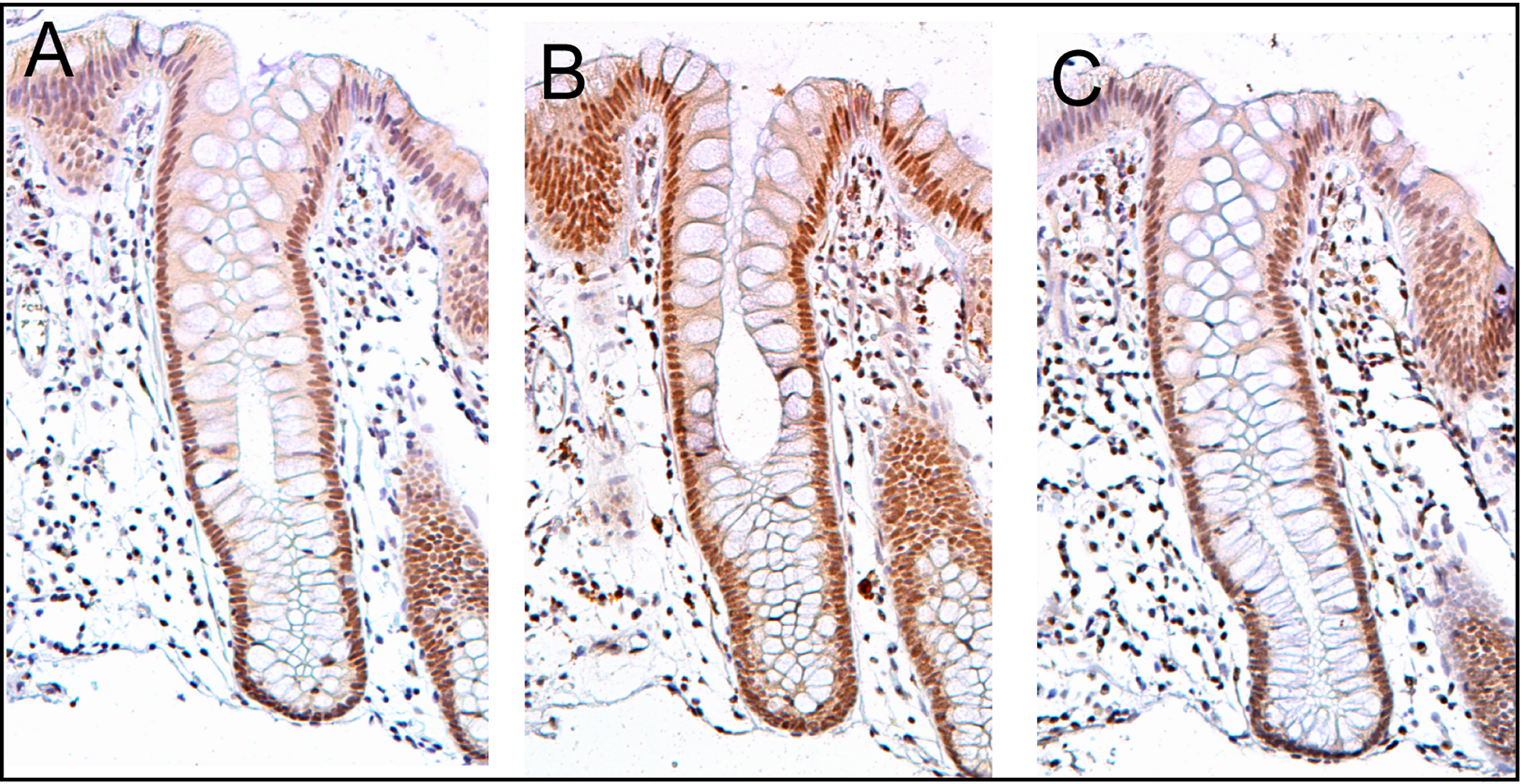
Sequential sections of the same colon crypt with immunohistochemical staining (brown) showing normal high expression of DNA repair proteins PMS2 (A), ERCC1 (B) and ERCC4 (XPF) (C). This crypt is from the biopsy of a 58-year-old male patient who had never had colonic neoplasia, and it shows high expression of these DNA repair proteins in the absorptive cell nuclei throughout most of the crypt. Note that PMS2 and ERCC4 (XPF) expression (in panels A and C) is reduced or absent in the nuclei of cells at the top of the crypt and within the surface of the colonic lumen between crypts. Original image, also in a publication.

PMS2 is usually expressed at a high level in the cell nuclei of enterocytes (absorptive cells) within the colonic crypts lining the inner surface of the colon (see image, panel A). DNA repair, involving high expression of PMS2, ERCC1 and ERCC4 (XPF) proteins, appears to be very active in colon crypts in normal, non-neoplastic colonic epithelium. In the case of PMS2, the expression level in normal colonic epithelium is high in 77% to 100% of crypts.

Cells are produced at the crypt base and migrate upward along the crypt axis before being shed into the colonic lumen days later. There are 5 to 6 stem cells at the bases of the crypts. If the stem cells at the base of the crypt express PMS2, generally all several thousand cells of the crypt will also express PMS2. This is indicated by the brown color seen by immunostaining of PMS2 in most of the enterocytes in the crypt in panel A of the image in this section. Similar expression of ERCC4 (XPF) and ERCC1 occurs in the thousands of enterocytes in each colonic crypt of the normal colonic epithelium.

The tissue section in the image shown here was also counterstained with hematoxylin to stain DNA in nuclei a blue-gray color. Nuclei of cells in the lamina propria (cells which are below and surround the epithelial crypts) largely show hematoxylin blue-gray color and have little expression of PMS2, ERCC1, or ERCC4 (XPF).

=== Colon cancer ===
About 88% of cells of epithelial origin in colon cancers, and about 50% of the colon crypts in the epithelium within 10 cm adjacent to cancers (in the field defects from which the cancers likely arose) have reduced or absent expression of PMS2.

Deficiencies in PMS2 in colon epithelium appear to be mostly due to epigenetic repression. In tumors classified as mismatch repair deficient and lacking, in a majority PMS2 expression is deficient because of lack of its pairing partner MLH1. Pairing of PMS2 with MLH1 stabilizes. The loss of MLH1 in sporadic cancers was due to epigenetic silencing caused by promoter methylation in 65 out of 66 cases. In 16 cancers, Pms2 was deficient despite MLH1 protein expression. Of these 16 cases, no cause was determined in 10, but 6 had a heterozygous germline mutation in Pms2, followed by likely loss of heterozygosity in the tumor. Thus, only 6 of 119 tumors lacking PMS2 expression (5%) were due to PMS2 mutations.

=== Coordination with ERCC1 and ERCC4 (XPF) ===
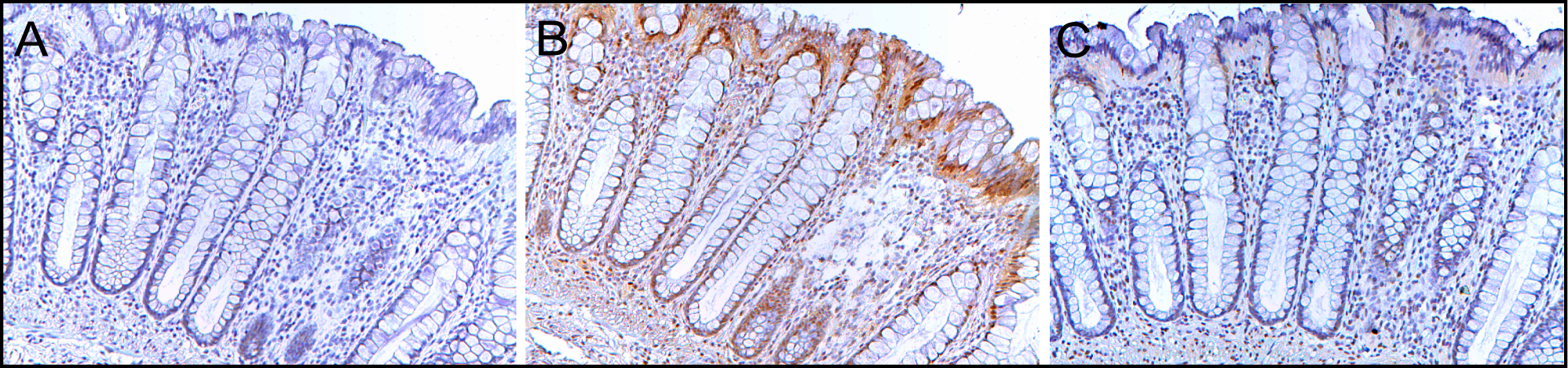
Sequential sections of a segment of colon epithelium near a colorectal cancer showing reduced or absent expression of PMS2 (A), ERCC1 (B) and ERCC4 (C) in the colon crypts. This tissue segment is from a histologically normal area of a colon resection of a male patient who had an adenocarcinoma in the sigmoid colon. For PMS2 (A), there is absent expression in cell nuclei of the crypt body, the crypt neck, and the colonic lumen surface for all epithelial cells. For ERCC1 (B), there is reduced expression in most of the cell nuclei of the crypts, but there is high expression in cell nuclei at the neck of the crypts and in the adjacent colonic lumen surface. For ERCC4 (XPF) (C), there is absent expression in most of the cell nuclei of the crypts and in the colonic lumen in this area of tissue, but detectable expression at the neck of some crypts. The reductions or absence of expression of these DNA repair genes in this tissue appears to be due to epigenetic repression. Original image, also in a publication.

When PMS2 is reduced in colonic crypts in a field defect, it is most often associated with reduced expression of DNA repair enzymes ERCC1 and ERCC4 (XPF) as well (see images in this section). A deficiency in ERCC1 and/or ERCC4 (XPF) would cause DNA damage accumulation. Such excess DNA damage often leads to apoptosis. However, an added defect in PMS2 can inhibit this apoptosis. Thus, an added deficiency in PMS2 likely would be selected for in the face of the increased DNA damages when ERCC1 and/or ERCC4 (XPF) are deficient. When ERCC1 deficient Chinese hamster ovary cells were repeatedly subjected to DNA damage, of five clones derived from the surviving cells, three were mutated in Pms2.

=== Progression to colon cancer ===
ERCC1, PMS2 double mutant Chinese hamster ovary cells, when exposed to Ultraviolet light (a DNA-damaging agent), showed a 7,375-fold greater mutation frequency than wild type Chinese hamster ovary cells, and a 967-fold greater mutation frequency than the cells defective in ERCC1, alone. Thus colonic cell deficiency in both ERCC1 and PMS2 causes genome instability. A similar genetically unstable situation is expected for cells doubly defective for PMS2 and ERCC4 (XPF). This instability would likely enhance progression to colon cancer by causing a mutator phenotype, and account for the presence of the cells doubly deficient in PMS2 and ERCC1 [or PMS2 and ERCC4 (XPF)] in field defects associated with colon cancer. As indicated by Harper and Elledge, defects in the ability to properly respond to and repair DNA damage underlie many forms of cancer.
