= Neoplasm =

Tumor or other abnormal growth of tissue

- Other names: Tumor, tumour, carcinocytes
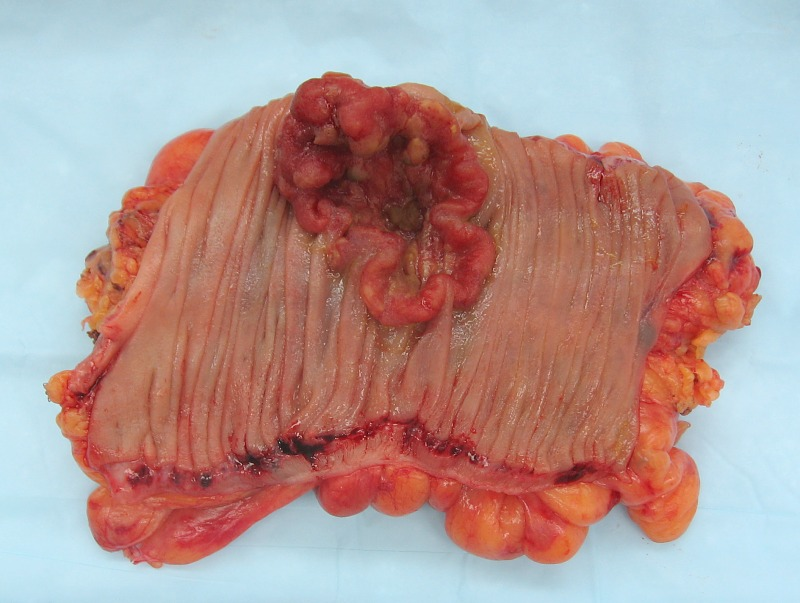
- Colectomy specimen containing a malignant neoplasm, namely an invasive example of colorectal cancer (the crater-like, reddish, irregularly shaped tumor at top-center)
- Specialty: Oncology
- Symptoms: Lump
- Complications: Cancer
- Causes: Radiation, environmental factor, certain infections

A neoplasm (/ˈniːoʊplæzəm, ˈniːə-/) is a type of abnormal and excessive growth of cells. The process that occurs to form or produce a neoplasm is called neoplasia. The growth of a neoplasm is uncoordinated with that of the normal surrounding tissue, and persists in growing abnormally, even if the original trigger is removed. This abnormal growth usually forms a mass, which may be called a tumour or tumor.

ICD-10 classifies neoplasms into four main groups: benign neoplasms, in situ neoplasms, malignant neoplasms, and neoplasms of uncertain or unknown behavior. Malignant neoplasms are also simply known as cancers and are the focus of oncology.

Prior to the abnormal growth of tissue, such as neoplasia, cells often undergo an abnormal pattern of growth, such as metaplasia or dysplasia. However, metaplasia or dysplasia does not always progress to neoplasia and can occur in other conditions as well. The word neoplasm is from Ancient Greek νέος- neo 'new' and πλάσμα plasma 'formation, creation'.

== Types ==
A neoplasm can be benign, potentially malignant, or malignant (cancer).

- Benign tumors include uterine fibroids, osteophytes, and melanocytic nevi (skin moles). They are circumscribed and localized and do not transform into cancer.
- Potentially-malignant neoplasms include carcinoma in situ. They are localised, and do not invade and destroy but in time, may transform into cancer.
- Malignant neoplasms are commonly called cancer. They invade and destroy the surrounding tissue, may form metastases and, if untreated or unresponsive to treatment, will generally prove fatal.
- Secondary neoplasm refers to any of a class of cancerous tumor that is either a metastatic offshoot of a primary tumor, or an apparently unrelated tumor that increases in frequency following certain cancer treatments such as chemotherapy or radiotherapy.
- Rarely there can be a metastatic neoplasm with no known site of the primary cancer and this is classed as a cancer of unknown primary origin.

=== Clonality ===
Neoplastic tumors are often heterogeneous and contain more than one type of cell, but their initiation and continued growth are usually dependent on a single population of neoplastic cells. These cells are presumed to be monoclonal – that is, they are derived from the same cell, and all carry the same genetic or epigenetic anomaly – evident of clonality. For lymphoid neoplasms, e.g. lymphoma and leukemia, clonality is proven by the amplification of a single rearrangement of their immunoglobulin gene (for B cell lesions) or T cell receptor gene (for T cell lesions). The demonstration of clonality is now considered to be necessary to identify a lymphoid cell proliferation as neoplastic.

=== Neoplasm vs. tumor ===
The word tumor or tumour comes from the Latin word for swelling, which is one of the cardinal signs of inflammation. The word originally referred to any form of swelling, neoplastic or not. In modern English, tumor (non-US spelling: tumour) is used as a synonym for a neoplasm (a solid or fluid-filled cystic lesion that may or may not be formed by an abnormal growth of neoplastic cells) that appears enlarged in size. Some neoplasms do not form a tumor; these include leukemia and most forms of carcinoma in situ. Tumor is also not synonymous with cancer. While cancer is by definition malignant, a tumor can be benign, precancerous, or malignant.

The terms mass and nodule are often used synonymously with tumor. Generally speaking, however, the term tumor is used generically, without reference to the physical size of the lesion. More specifically, the term mass is often used when the lesion has a maximal diameter of at least 20 millimeters (mm) in the greatest direction, while the term nodule is usually used when the size of the lesion is less than 20 mm in its greatest dimension (25.4 mm = 1 inch).

== Causes ==
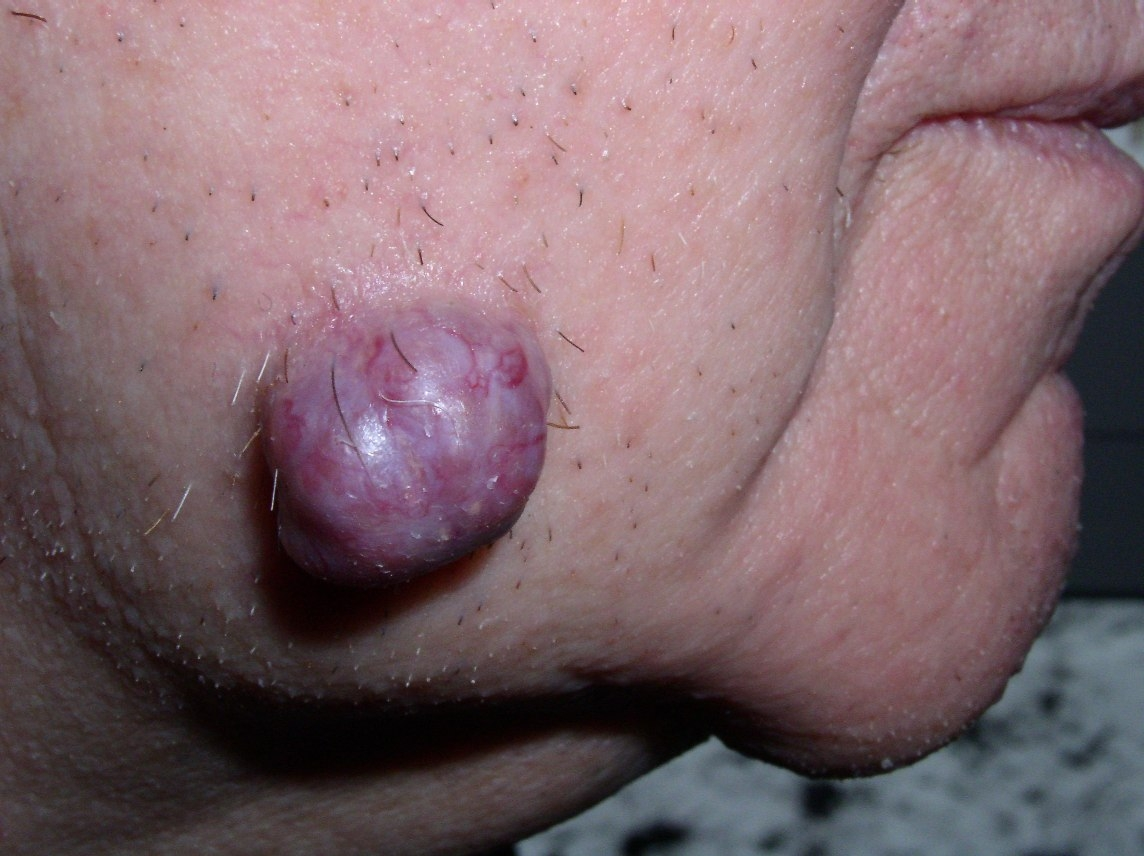
Neoplastic tumor of the cheek skin, here a benign neoplasm of the sweat glands called hidradenoma, which is not solid but is fluid-filled

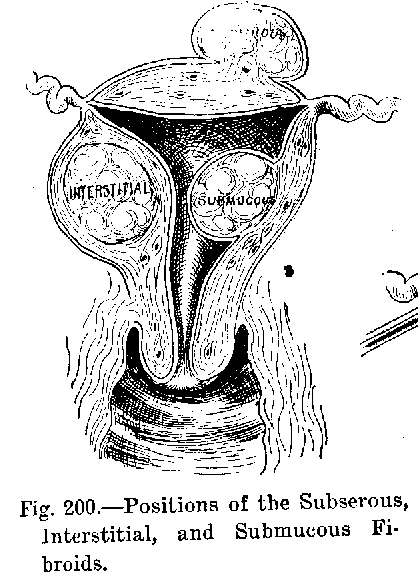
Diagram illustrating benign neoplasms, namely fibroids of the uterus

Tumors in humans occur as a result of accumulated genetic and epigenetic alterations within single cells, which cause the cell to divide and expand uncontrollably. A neoplasm can be caused by an abnormal proliferation of tissues, which can be caused by genetic mutations. Not all types of neoplasms cause a tumorous overgrowth of tissue (such as leukemia or carcinoma in situ); however, similarities between neoplasmic growths and regenerative processes, e.g., dedifferentiation and rapid cell proliferation, have been pointed out.

Tumor growth has been studied using mathematics and continuum mechanics. Vascular tumors such as hemangiomas and lymphangiomas (formed from blood or lymph vessels) are thus looked at as being amalgams of a solid skeleton formed by sticky cells and an organic liquid filling the spaces in which cells can grow. Under this type of model, mechanical stresses and strains can be dealt with and their influence on the growth of the tumor and the surrounding tissue and vasculature elucidated. Recent findings from experiments that use this model show that active growth of the tumor is restricted to the outer edges of the tumor and that stiffening of the underlying normal tissue inhibits tumor growth as well.

Benign conditions that are not associated with an abnormal proliferation of tissue (such as sebaceous cysts) can also present as tumors, however, but have no malignant potential. Examples include breast cysts, which commonly occur during pregnancy and at other times, as well as other encapsulated glandular swellings (thyroid, adrenal gland, pancreas).

Encapsulated hematomas, encapsulated necrotic tissue (from an insect bite, foreign body, or other noxious mechanism), keloids (discrete overgrowths of scar tissue) and granulomas may also present as tumors.

Discrete localized enlargements of normal structures (ureters, blood vessels, intrahepatic or extrahepatic biliary ducts, pulmonary inclusions, or gastrointestinal duplications) due to outflow obstructions or narrowings, or abnormal connections, may also present as a tumor. Examples are arteriovenous fistulae or aneurysms (with or without thrombosis), biliary fistulae or aneurysms, sclerosing cholangitis, cysticercosis or hydatid cysts, intestinal duplications, and pulmonary inclusions as seen with cystic fibrosis. It can be dangerous to biopsy a number of types of tumor in which the leakage of their contents would potentially be catastrophic. When such types of tumors are encountered, diagnostic modalities such as ultrasound, CT scans, MRI, angiograms, and nuclear medicine scans are employed prior to (or during) biopsy or surgical exploration/excision in an attempt to avoid such severe complications.

== Development ==
Tumor development occurs in three stages: tumor initiation, tumor promotion, and tumor progression.

=== Initiation ===
During tumor initiation, the first phase in tumor development, "normal cells are changed so that they are able to form tumors" by tumor initiators, such as mutagens and carcinogens.

=== Promotion ===
During tumor promotion, various factors permit the descendants of a single initiated cell to survive and expand in number, i.e. to resist apoptosis and to undergo clonal growth. This is a step toward tumor progression.

To survive, a tumor cell must decrease its expression of tumor suppressor genes such as p53, BRCA1, BRCA2, RB1, or the fas receptor. A tumor suppressor would trigger an apoptotic pathway in a cancer cell if there were DNA damage, polyploidy, or uncontrolled cell growth.

Simultaneously, tumor cells need to upregulate oncogenes, which promote or cause downstream activation of growth factors and cell survival signals such as RAS, Mitogen-activated protein kinase kinase, VEGF, or Akt.

=== Progression ===
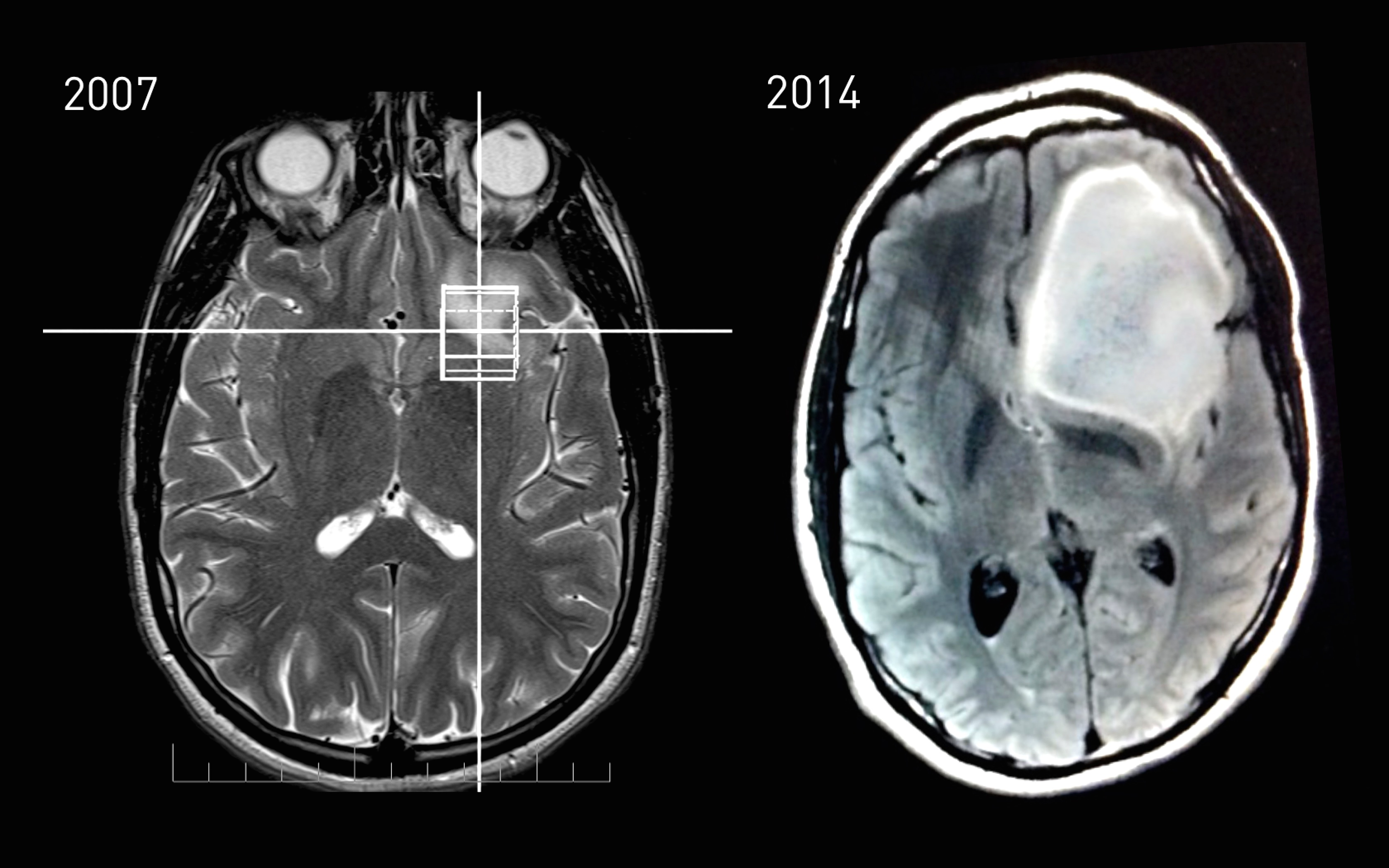
MRI scans of a patient with astrocytoma, showing the tumor's progression between the incidental finding in 2007 and the onset of phenotypical changes in 2014.

Tumor progression, the third and last phase in tumor development, is characterised by increased growth speed and invasiveness of the tumor cells. Consequently, phenotypical changes occur, and the tumor becomes more aggressive and acquires greater malignant potential. Together with the progression, more and more aneuploidy occurs. This may be evident as nuclear polymorphism.

== Malignant neoplasms ==
=== DNA damage ===
The central role of DNA damage and epigenetic defects in DNA repair genes in malignant neoplasms

DNA damage is considered to be the primary underlying cause of malignant neoplasms known as cancers. Its central role in progression to cancer is illustrated in the figure in this section, in the box near the top. DNA damage, epigenetic alterations, and DNA repair deficiency are key features in cancer progression and are thus shown in red. DNA damage is very common. Naturally occurring DNA damages (mostly due to cellular metabolism and the properties of DNA in water at body temperatures) occur at a rate of more than 10,000 new damages, on average, per human cell, per day. Additional DNA damages can arise from exposure to exogenous agents. Tobacco smoke causes increased exogenous DNA damage, and these DNA damages are the likely cause of lung cancer due to smoking. UV light from solar radiation causes DNA damage that is important in melanoma. Helicobacter pylori infection produces high levels of reactive oxygen species that damage DNA and contributes to gastric cancer. Bile acids, at high levels in the colons of humans eating a high-fat diet, also cause DNA damage and contribute to colon cancer. Katsurano et al. indicated that macrophages and neutrophils in an inflamed colonic epithelium are the source of reactive oxygen species causing the DNA damages that initiate colonic tumorigenesis (creation of tumors in the colon). Some sources of DNA damage are indicated in the boxes at the top of the figure in this section.

Individuals with a germline mutation causing deficiency in any of 34 DNA repair genes (see article DNA repair-deficiency disorder) are at increased risk of cancer. Some germline mutations in DNA repair genes cause up to 100% lifetime chance of cancer (e.g., p53 mutations). These germline mutations are indicated in a box at the left of the figure with an arrow indicating their contribution to DNA repair deficiency.

About 70% of malignant (cancerous) neoplasms have no hereditary component and are called "sporadic cancers". Only a minority of sporadic cancers have a deficiency in DNA repair due to mutation in a DNA repair gene. However, a majority of sporadic cancers have deficiency in DNA repair due to epigenetic alterations that reduce or silence DNA repair gene expression. For example, of 113 sequential colorectal cancers, only four had a missense mutation in the DNA repair gene MGMT, while the majority had reduced MGMT expression due to methylation of the MGMT promoter region (an epigenetic alteration). Five reports present evidence that between 40% and 90% of colorectal cancers have reduced MGMT expression due to methylation of the MGMT promoter region.

Similarly, out of 119 cases of mismatch repair-deficient colorectal cancers that lacked DNA repair gene PMS2 expression, PMS2 was deficient in 6 due to mutations in the PMS2 gene, while in 103 cases PMS2 expression was deficient because its pairing partner MLH1 was repressed due to promoter methylation (PMS2 protein is unstable in the absence of MLH1). In the other 10 cases, loss of PMS2 expression was likely due to epigenetic overexpression of the microRNA, miR-155, which down-regulates MLH1.

In further examples, epigenetic defects were found at frequencies of between 13%-100% for the DNA repair genes BRCA1, WRN, FANCB, FANCF, MGMT, MLH1, MSH2, MSH4, ERCC1, XPF, NEIL1 and ATM. These epigenetic defects occurred in various cancers, including breast, ovarian, colorectal, and head and neck cancers. Two or three deficiencies in expression of ERCC1, XPF or PMS2 occur simultaneously in the majority of the 49 colon cancers evaluated by Facista et al. Epigenetic alterations causing reduced expression of DNA repair genes is shown in a central box at the third level from the top of the figure in this section, and the consequent DNA repair deficiency is shown at the fourth level.

When expression of DNA repair genes is reduced, DNA damages accumulate in cells at a higher than normal level, and these excess damages cause increased frequencies of mutation or epimutation. Mutation rates strongly increase in cells defective in DNA mismatch repair or in homologous recombinational repair (HRR).

During repair of DNA double strand breaks, or repair of other DNA damages, incompletely cleared sites of repair can cause epigenetic gene silencing. DNA repair deficiencies (level 4 in the figure) cause increased DNA damages (level 5 in the figure) which result in increased somatic mutations and epigenetic alterations (level 6 in the figure).

Field defects, normal-appearing tissue with multiple alterations (and discussed in the section below), are common precursors to development of the disordered and improperly proliferating clone of tissue in a malignant neoplasm. Such field defects (second level from bottom of figure) may have multiple mutations and epigenetic alterations.

Once a cancer is formed, it usually has genome instability. This instability is likely due to reduced DNA repair or excessive DNA damage. Because of such instability, the cancer continues to evolve and to produce sub clones. For example, a renal cancer, sampled in 9 areas, had 40 ubiquitous mutations, demonstrating tumor heterogeneity (i.e. present in all areas of the cancer), 59 mutations shared by some (but not all areas), and 29 "private" mutations only present in one of the areas of the cancer.

=== Field defects ===
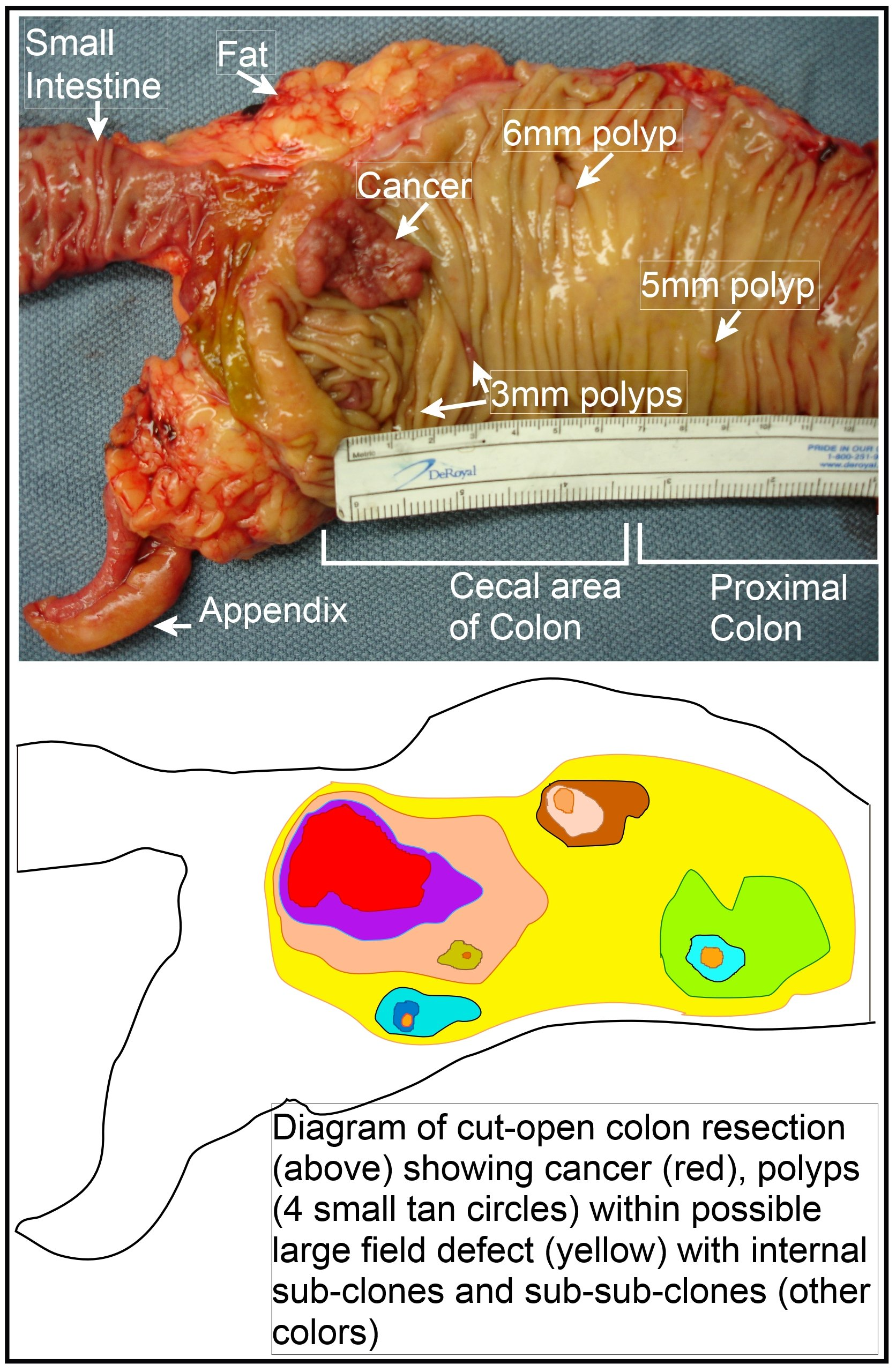
Longitudinally opened freshly resected colon segment showing a cancer and four polyps, plus a schematic diagram indicating a likely field defect (a region of tissue that precedes and predisposes to the development of cancer) in this colon segment. The diagram indicates sub-clones and sub-sub-clones that were precursors to the tumors.

Various other terms have been used to describe this phenomenon, including field effect, field cancerization, and field carcinogenesis. The term field cancerization was first used in 1953 to describe an area or "field" of epithelium that has been preconditioned by (at that time) largely unknown processes so as to predispose it towards development of cancer. Since then, the terms field cancerization and field defect have been used to describe pre-malignant tissue in which new cancers are likely to arise.

Field defects are important in progression to cancer. However, in most cancer research, as pointed out by Rubin "The vast majority of studies in cancer research has been done on well-defined tumors in vivo, or on discrete neoplastic foci in vitro. Yet there is evidence that more than 80% of the somatic mutations found in mutator phenotype human colorectal tumors occur before the onset of terminal clonal expansion. Similarly, Vogelstein et al. point out that more than half of somatic mutations identified in tumors occurred in a pre-neoplastic phase (in a field defect), during growth of apparently normal cells. Likewise, epigenetic alterations present in tumors may have occurred in pre-neoplastic field defects.

An expanded view of field effect has been termed "etiologic field effect", which encompasses not only molecular and pathologic changes in pre-neoplastic cells but also influences of exogenous environmental factors and molecular changes in the local microenvironment on neoplastic evolution from tumor initiation to patient death.

In the colon, a field defect probably arises by natural selection of a mutant or epigenetically altered cell among the stem cells at the base of one of the intestinal crypts on the inside surface of the colon. A mutant or epigenetically altered stem cell may replace the other nearby stem cells by natural selection. Thus, a patch of abnormal tissue may arise. The figure in this section includes a photo of a freshly resected and lengthwise-opened segment of the colon showing a colon cancer and four polyps. Below the photo, there is a schematic diagram of how a large patch of mutant or epigenetically altered cells may have formed, shown by the large area in yellow in the diagram. Within this first large patch in the diagram (a large clone of cells), a second such mutation or epigenetic alteration may occur so that a given stem cell acquires an advantage compared to other stem cells within the patch, and this altered stem cell may expand clonally forming a secondary patch, or sub-clone, within the original patch. This is indicated in the diagram by four smaller patches of different colors within the large yellow original area. Within these new patches (sub-clones), the process may be repeated multiple times, indicated by the still smaller patches within the four secondary patches (with still different colors in the diagram) which clonally expand, until stem cells arise that generate either small polyps or else a malignant neoplasm (cancer).

In the photo, an apparent field defect in this segment of a colon has generated four polyps (labeled with the size of the polyps, 6mm, 5mm, and two of 3mm, and a cancer about 3 cm across in its longest dimension). These neoplasms are also indicated, in the diagram below the photo, by 4 small tan circles (polyps) and a larger red area (cancer). The cancer in the photo occurred in the cecal area of the colon, where the colon joins the small intestine (labeled) and where the appendix occurs (labeled). The fat in the photo is external to the outer wall of the colon. In the segment of colon shown here, the colon was cut open lengthwise to expose the inner surface of the colon and to display the cancer and polyps occurring within the inner epithelial lining of the colon.

If the general process by which sporadic colon cancers arise is the formation of a pre-neoplastic clone that spreads by natural selection, followed by formation of internal sub-clones within the initial clone, and sub-sub-clones inside those, then colon cancers generally should be associated with, and be preceded by, fields of increasing abnormality reflecting the succession of premalignant events. The most extensive region of abnormality (the outermost yellow irregular area in the diagram) would reflect the earliest event in formation of a malignant neoplasm.

In experimental evaluation of specific DNA repair deficiencies in cancers, many specific DNA repair deficiencies were also shown to occur in the field defects surrounding those cancers. The Table, below, gives examples for which the DNA repair deficiency in a cancer was shown to be caused by an epigenetic alteration, and the somewhat lower frequencies with which the same epigenetically caused DNA repair deficiency was found in the surrounding field defect.

Frequency of epigenetic changes in DNA repair genes in sporadic cancers and in adjacent field defects
Cancer	Gene	Frequency in cancer	Frequency in field defect	Ref.
Colorectal	MGMT	46%	34%	
Colorectal	MGMT	47%	11%	
Colorectal	MGMT	70%	60%	
Colorectal	MSH2	13%	5%	
Colorectal	ERCC1	100%	40%	
Colorectal	PMS2	88%	50%	
Colorectal	XPF	55%	40%	
Head and neck	MGMT	54%	38%	
Head and neck	MLH1	33%	25%	
Head and neck	MLH1	31%	20%	
Stomach	MGMT	88%	78%	
Stomach	MLH1	73%	20%	
Esophagus	MLH1	77%-100%	23%-79%	

Some of the small polyps in the field defect shown in the photo of the opened colon segment may be relatively benign neoplasms. Of polyps less than 10mm in size, found during colonoscopy and followed with repeat colonoscopies for 3 years, 25% were unchanged in size, 35% regressed or shrank in size while 40% grew in size.

=== Genome instability ===
Cancers are known to exhibit genome instability or a mutator phenotype. The protein-coding DNA within the nucleus is about 1.5% of the total genomic DNA. Within this protein-coding DNA (called the exome), an average cancer of the breast or colon can have about 60 to 70 protein altering mutations, of which about 3 or 4 may be "driver" mutations, and the remaining ones may be "passenger" mutations. However, the average number of DNA sequence mutations in the entire genome (including non-protein-coding regions) within a breast cancer tissue sample is about 20,000. In an average melanoma tissue sample (where melanomas have a higher exome mutation frequency) the total number of DNA sequence mutations is about 80,000. This compares to the very low mutation frequency of about 70 new mutations in the entire genome between generations (parent to child) in humans.

The high frequencies of mutations in the total nucleotide sequences within cancers suggest that often an early alteration in the field defects giving rise to a cancer (e.g. yellow area in the diagram in this section) is a deficiency in DNA repair. The large field defects surrounding colon cancers (extending to at about 10 cm on each side of a cancer) were shown by Facista et al. to frequently have epigenetic defects in 2 or 3 DNA repair proteins (ERCC1, XPF or PMS2) in the entire area of the field defect. Deficiencies in DNA repair cause increased mutation rates. A deficiency in DNA repair, itself, can allow DNA damages to accumulate, and error-prone translesion synthesis past some of those damages may give rise to mutations. In addition, faulty repair of these accumulated DNA damages may give rise to epimutations. These new mutations or epimutations may provide a proliferative advantage, generating a field defect. Although the mutations/epimutations in DNA repair genes do not, themselves, confer a selective advantage, they may be carried along as passengers in cells when the cells acquire additional mutations/epimutations that do provide a proliferative advantage.

== Etymology ==
The term neoplasm is a synonym of tumor. Neoplasia denotes the process of the formation of neoplasms/tumors, and the process is referred to as a neoplastic process. The word neoplastic itself comes from Greek neo 'new' and plastic 'formed, molded'.

The term tumor derives from the Latin noun tumor 'a swelling', ultimately from the verb tumēre 'to swell'. In the British Commonwealth, the spelling tumour is commonly used, whereas in the U.S. the word is usually spelled tumor.

In its medical sense, tumor has traditionally meant an abnormal swelling of the flesh. The Roman medical encyclopedist Celsus (c. 30 BC–38 AD) described the four cardinal signs of acute inflammation as tumor, dolor, calor, and rubor (swelling, pain, increased heat, and redness). (His treatise, De Medicina, was the first medical book printed in 1478 following the invention of the movable-type printing press.)

In contemporary English, the word tumor is often used as a synonym for a cystic (liquid-filled) growth or solid neoplasm (cancerous or non-cancerous), with other forms of swelling often referred to as "swellings".

Related terms occur commonly in the medical literature, where the nouns tumefaction and tumescence (derived from the adjective tumescent) are current medical terms for non-neoplastic swelling. This type of swelling is most often caused by inflammation caused by trauma, infection, and other factors.

Tumors may be caused by conditions other than an overgrowth of neoplastic cells, however. Cysts (such as sebaceous cysts) are also referred to as tumors, even though they have no neoplastic cells. This is standard in medical-billing terminology (especially when billing for a growth whose pathology has yet to be determined).

== See also ==
- Epidemiology of cancer
- List of biological development disorders
- Pleomorphism
- Somatic evolution in cancer
