= ERCC4 =

Protein-coding gene in the species Homo sapiens

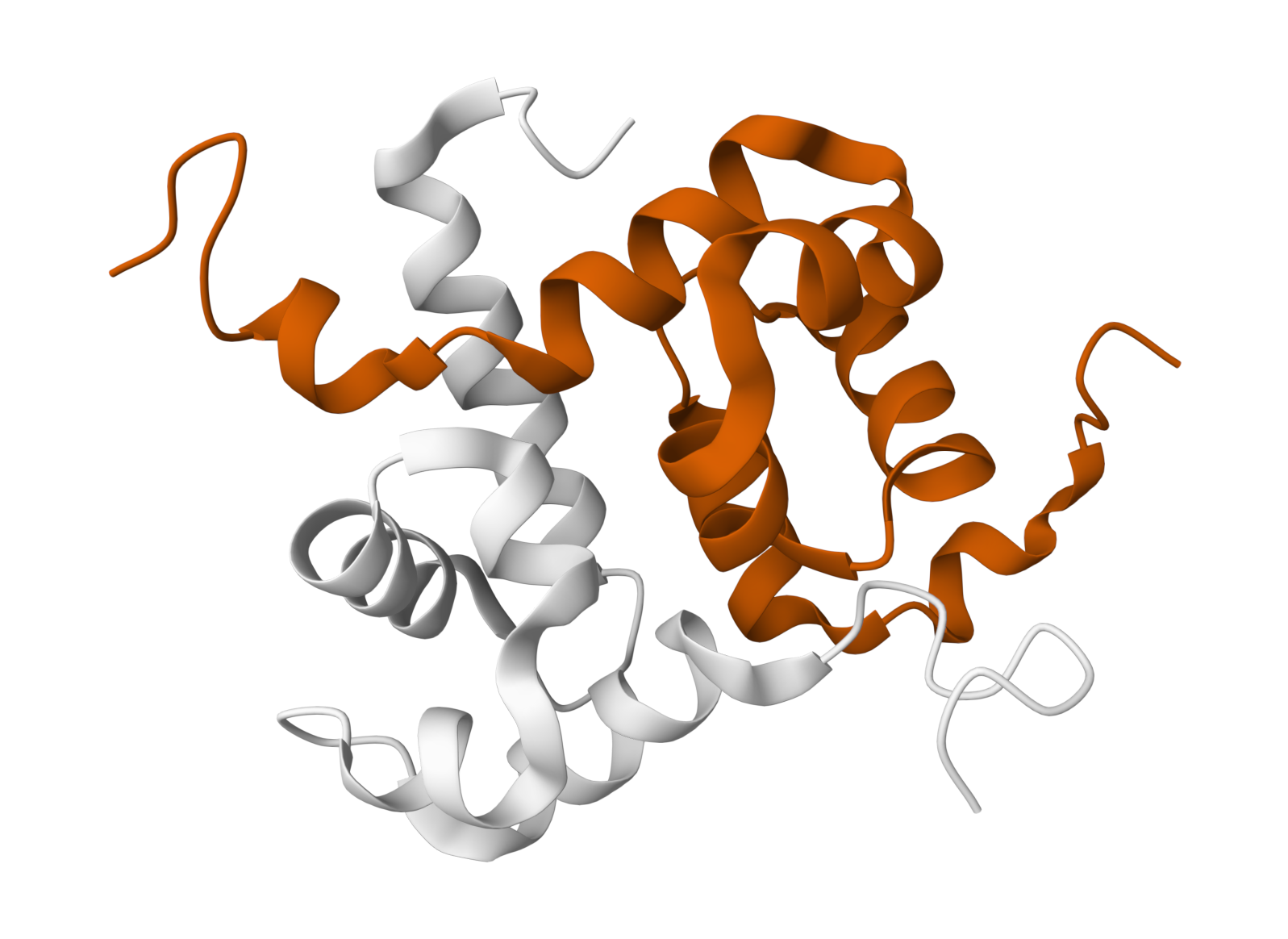

Identifiers
- Aliases: ERCC4, ERCC11, FANCQ, RAD1, XPF, XFEPS, excision repair cross-complementation group 4, ERCC excision repair 4, endonuclease catalytic subunit, RAD1 checkpoint DNA exonuclease, cell cycle checkpoint protein Hrad1, DNA repair exonuclease rad1 homolog, exonuclease homolog RAD1, RAD1 checkpoint clamp component, rad1-like DNA damage checkpoint protein, cell cycle checkpoint protein RAD1, RAD1 homolog, DNA repair exonuclease REC1, checkpoint control protein HRAD1
- External IDs: OMIM: 133520; MGI: 1354163; GeneCards: ERCC4
Available structures
PDB	Ortholog search: PDBe RCSB
PDB	List of PDB id codes 1Z00, 2A1J, 2MUT, 2KN7, 2AQ0

Gene location (Human)
Chr.	Chromosome 16 (human)
Band	16p13.12	Start	13,920,138 bp
Band	16p13.12	End	13,952,348 bp

Gene location (Mouse)
Chr.	Chromosome 16 (mouse)
Band	16|16 A1	Start	12,927,548 bp
Band	16|16 A1	End	12,968,481 bp
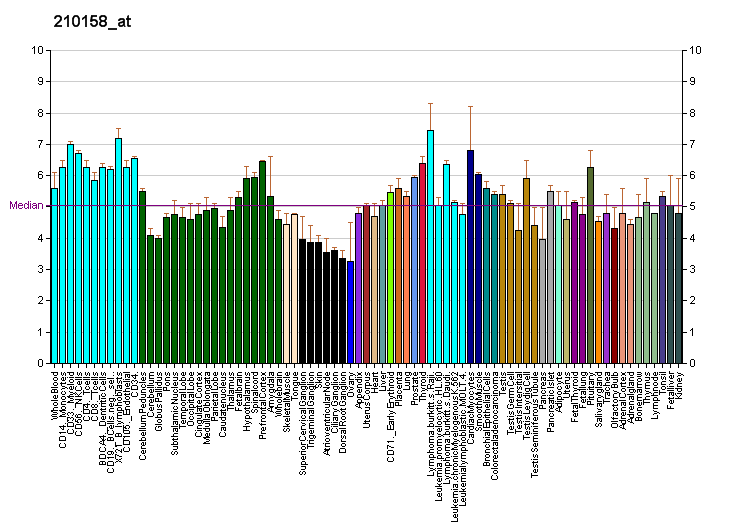
RNA expression pattern
Bgee	Human / Mouse (ortholog); Top expressed in: testicle; sperm; gonad; Achilles tendon; stromal cell of endometrium; ganglionic eminence; secondary oocyte; right testis; ventricular zone; sural nerve / Top expressed in: seminiferous tubule; spermatid; spermatocyte; proximal tubule; lumbar subsegment of spinal cord; superior frontal gyrus; ventricular zone; right kidney; medullary collecting duct; thymus; More reference expression data
BioGPS	More reference expression data
Gene ontology
Molecular function	protein N-terminus binding; damaged DNA binding; protein C-terminus binding; protein binding; TFIID-class transcription factor complex binding; nuclease activity; endonuclease activity; hydrolase activity; endodeoxyribonuclease activity; single-stranded DNA binding; telomerase inhibitor activity; 3' overhang single-stranded DNA endodeoxyribonuclease activity; DNA binding; identical protein binding; single-stranded DNA endodeoxyribonuclease activity
Cellular component	ERCC4-ERCC1 complex; transcription factor TFIID complex; nucleoplasm; telomere; nucleotide-excision repair factor 1 complex; nucleotide-excision repair complex; nucleus
Biological process	resolution of meiotic recombination intermediates; interstrand cross-link repair; cellular response to UV; cellular response to DNA damage stimulus; global genome nucleotide-excision repair; nucleotide-excision repair involved in interstrand cross-link repair; UV protection; negative regulation of telomere maintenance; transcription-coupled nucleotide-excision repair; nucleotide-excision repair, DNA incision; telomere maintenance; response to UV; double-strand break repair via homologous recombination; DNA repair; nucleotide-excision repair, DNA incision, 3'-to lesion; nucleotide-excision repair; nucleotide-excision repair, DNA incision, 5'-to lesion; nucleotide-excision repair, preincision complex stabilization; double-strand break repair via nonhomologous end joining; negative regulation of telomerase activity; negative regulation of telomere maintenance via telomere lengthening; negative regulation of protection from non-homologous end joining at telomere; negative regulation of double-stranded telomeric DNA binding; telomeric DNA-containing double minutes formation; regulation of autophagy
Sources:Amigo / QuickGO
Orthologs
Databases	NCBI: entry; OMA: entry
Species	Human	Mouse
Entrez	2072	50505
Ensembl	ENSG00000175595	ENSMUSG00000022545
UniProt	Q92889	Q9QZD4
RefSeq (mRNA)	NM_005236	NM_015769
RefSeq (protein)	NP_005227	NP_056584
Location (UCSC)	Chr 16: 13.92 – 13.95 Mb	Chr 16: 12.93 – 12.97 Mb
PubMed search
- Wikidata
View/Edit Human	View/Edit Mouse

ERCC4 is a protein designated as DNA repair endonuclease XPF that in humans is encoded by the ERCC4 gene. Together with ERCC1, ERCC4 forms the ERCC1-XPF enzyme complex that participates in DNA repair and DNA recombination.

The nuclease enzyme ERCC1-XPF cuts specific structures of DNA. Many aspects of these two gene products are described together here because they are partners during DNA repair. The ERCC1-XPF nuclease is an essential activity in the pathway of DNA nucleotide excision repair (NER). The ERCC1-XPF nuclease also functions in pathways to repair double-strand breaks in DNA, and in the repair of "crosslink" damage that harmfully links the two DNA strands.

Cells with disabling mutations in ERCC4 are more sensitive than normal to particular DNA damaging agents, including ultraviolet radiation and to chemicals that cause crosslinking between DNA strands. Genetically engineered mice with disabling mutations in ERCC4 also have defects in DNA repair, accompanied by metabolic stress-induced changes in physiology that result in premature aging. Complete deletion of ERCC4 is incompatible with viability of mice, and no human individuals have been found with complete (homozygous) deletion of ERCC4. Rare individuals in the human population harbor inherited mutations that impair the function of ERCC4. When the normal genes are absent, these mutations can lead to human syndromes, including xeroderma pigmentosum, Cockayne syndrome and Fanconi anemia.

ERCC1 and ERCC4 are the human gene names and Ercc1 and Ercc4 are the analogous mammalian gene names. Similar genes with similar functions are found in all eukaryotic organisms.

== Gene ==
The human ERCC4 gene can correct the DNA repair defect in specific ultraviolet light (UV)-sensitive mutant cell lines derived from Chinese hamster ovary cells. Multiple independent complementation groups of Chinese hamster ovary (CHO) cells have been isolated, and this gene restored UV resistance to cells of complementation group 4. Reflecting this cross-species genetic complementation method, the gene was called "Excision repair cross-complementing 4"

The human ERCC4 gene encodes the XPF protein of 916 amino acids with a molecular mass of about 104,000 daltons.

Genes similar to ERCC4 with equivalent functions (orthologs) are found in other eukaryotic genomes. Some of the most studied gene orthologs include RAD1 in the budding yeast Saccharomyces cerevisiae, and rad16+ in the fission yeast Schizosaccharomyces pombe.

== Protein ==
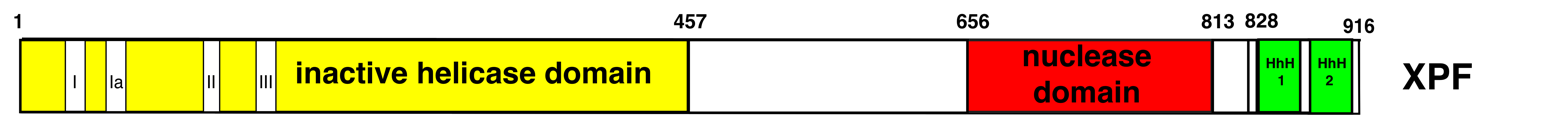
Figure 1: Diagram of XPF showing an inactive helicase domain, a nuclease domain and a helix-hairpin-helix domain

One ERCC1 molecule and one XPF molecule bind together, forming an ERCC1-XPF heterodimer which is the active nuclease form of the enzyme. In the ERCC1–XPF heterodimer, ERCC1 mediates DNA– and protein–protein interactions. XPF provides the endonuclease active site and is involved in DNA binding and additional protein–protein interactions.

The ERCC4/XPF protein consists of two conserved areas separated by a less conserved region in the middle. The N-terminal area has homology to several conserved domains of DNA helicases belonging to superfamily II, although XPF is not a DNA helicase. The C-terminal region of XPF includes the active site residues for nuclease activity. (Figure 1).

Most of the ERCC1 protein is related at the sequence level to the C terminus of the XPF protein., but residues in the nuclease domain are not present. A DNA binding "helix-hairpin-helix" domain at the C-terminus of each protein.

By primary sequence and protein structural similarity, the ERCC1-XPF nuclease is a member of a broader family of structure specific DNA nucleases comprising two subunits. Such nucleases include, for example, the MUS81-EME1 nuclease.

== Structure-specific nuclease ==
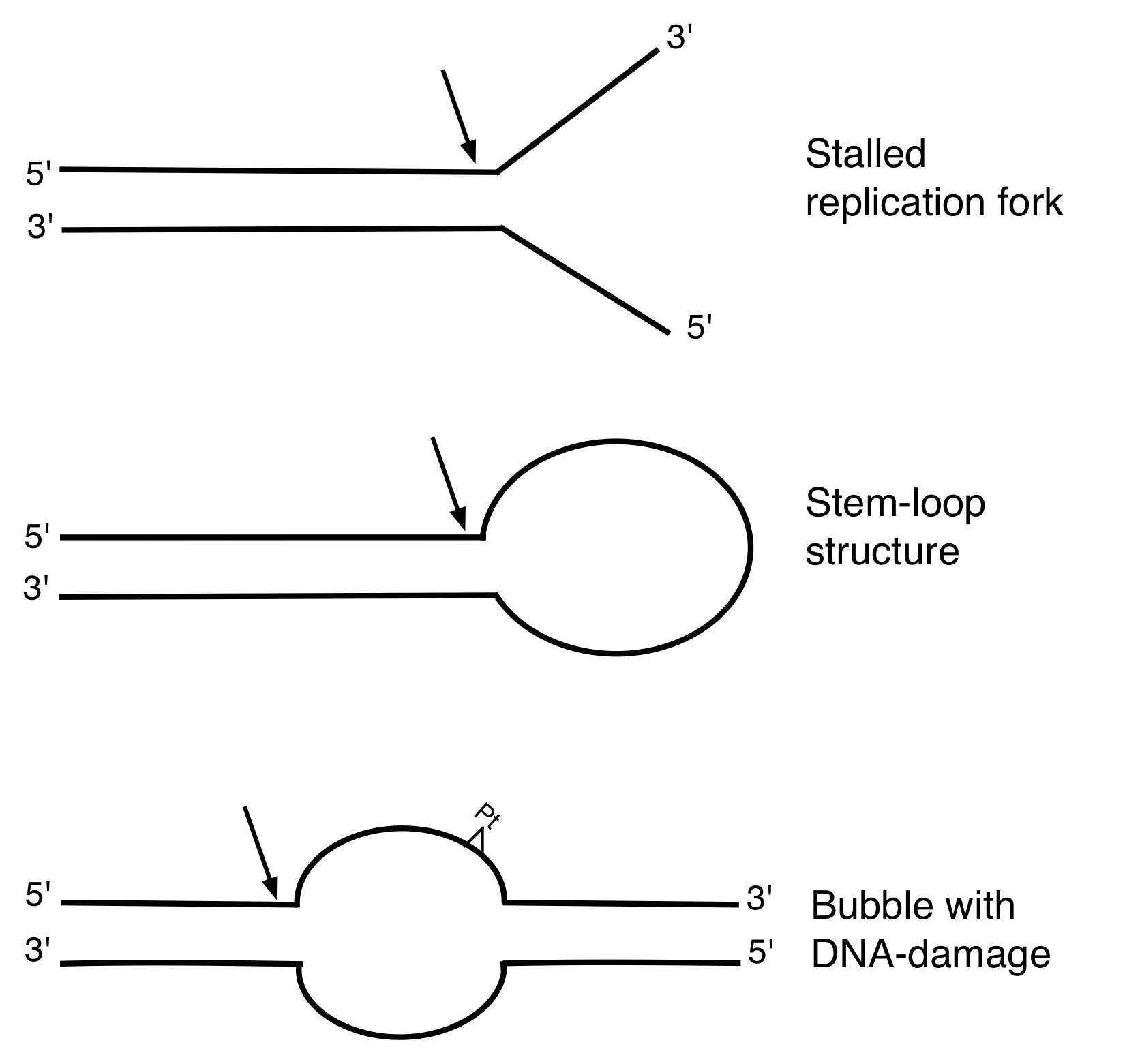
Figure 2: DNA substrates of ERCC1-XPF nuclease

The ERCC1–XPF complex is a structure-specific endonuclease. ERCC1-XPF does not cut DNA that is exclusively single-stranded or double-stranded, but it cleaves the DNA phosphodiester backbone specifically at junctions between double-stranded and single-stranded DNA. It introduces a cut in double-stranded DNA on the 5′ side of such a junction, about two nucleotides away (Figure 2). This structure-specificity was initially demonstrated for RAD10-RAD1, the yeast orthologs of ERCC1 and XPF.

The hydrophobic helix–hairpin–helix motifs in the C-terminal regions of ERCC1 and XPF interact to promote dimerization of the two proteins. There is no catalytic activity in the absence of dimerization. Indeed, although the catalytic domain is within XPF and ERCC1 is catalytically inactive, ERCC1 is indispensable for activity of the complex.

Several models have been proposed for binding of ERCC1–XPF to DNA, based on partial structures of relevant protein fragments at atomic resolution. DNA binding mediated by the helix-hairpin-helix domains of ERCC1 and XPF domains positions the heterodimer at the junction between double-stranded and single-stranded DNA.

=== Nucleotide excision repair (NER) ===
During nucleotide excision repair, several protein complexes cooperate to recognize damaged DNA and locally separate the DNA helix for a short distance on either side of the site of a site of DNA damage. The ERCC1–XPF nuclease incises the damaged DNA strand on the 5′ side of the lesion. During NER, the ERCC1 protein interacts with the XPA protein to coordinate DNA and protein binding.

=== DNA double-strand break (DSB) repair ===
Mammalian cells with mutant ERCC1–XPF are moderately more sensitive than normal cells to agents (such as ionizing radiation) that cause double-stranded breaks in DNA. Particular pathways of both homologous recombination repair and non-homologous end-joining rely on ERCC1-XPF function. The relevant activity of ERCC1–XPF for both types of double-strand break repair is the ability to remove non-homologous 3′ single-stranded tails from DNA ends before rejoining. This activity is needed during a single-strand annealing subpathway of homologous recombination. Trimming of 3' single-stranded tails is also needed in a mechanistically distinct subpathway of non-homologous end-joining, independent of the Ku proteins Homologous integration of DNA, an important technique for genetic manipulation, is dependent on the function of ERCC1-XPF in the host cell.

=== Interstrand crosslinks repair ===
Mammalian cells carrying mutations in ERCC1 or XPF are especially sensitive to agents that cause DNA interstrand crosslinks (ICL) Interstrand crosslinks block the progression of DNA replication, and structures at blocked DNA replication forks provide substrates for cleavage by ERCC1-XPF. Incisions may be made on either side of the crosslink on one DNA strand to unhook the crosslink and initiate repair. Alternatively, a double-strand break may be made in the DNA near the ICL, and subsequent homologous recombination repair my involve ERCC1-XPF action. Although not the only nuclease involved, ERCC1–XPF is required for ICL repair during several phases of the cell cycle.

== Clinical significance ==
=== Xeroderma pigmentosum (XP) ===
Some individuals with the rare inherited syndrome xeroderma pigmentosum have mutations in ERCC4. These patients are classified as XP complementation group F (XP-F). Diagnostic features of XP are dry scaly skin, abnormal skin pigmentation in sun-exposed areas and severe photosensitivity, accompanied by a great than 1000-fold increased risk of developing UV radiation-induced skin cancers.

=== Cockayne syndrome (CS) ===
Most XP-F patients show moderate symptoms of XP, but a few show additional symptoms of Cockayne syndrome. Cockayne syndrome (CS) patients exhibit photosensitivity, and also exhibit developmental defects and neurological symptoms.

Mutations in the ERCC4 gene can result in the very rare XF-E syndrome. These patients have characteristics of XP and CS, as well as additional neurologic, hepatobiliary, musculoskeletal and hematopoietic symptoms.

=== Fanconi anemia ===
Several human patients with symptoms of Fanconi anemia (FA) have causative mutations in the ERCC4 gene. Fanconi anemia is a complex disease, involving major hematopoietic symptoms. A characteristic feature of FA is the hypersensitivity to agents that cause interstrand DNA crosslinks. FA patients with ERCC4 mutations have been classified as belonging to Fanconi anemia complementation group Q (FANCQ).

=== ERCC4 (XPF) in the normal colon ===
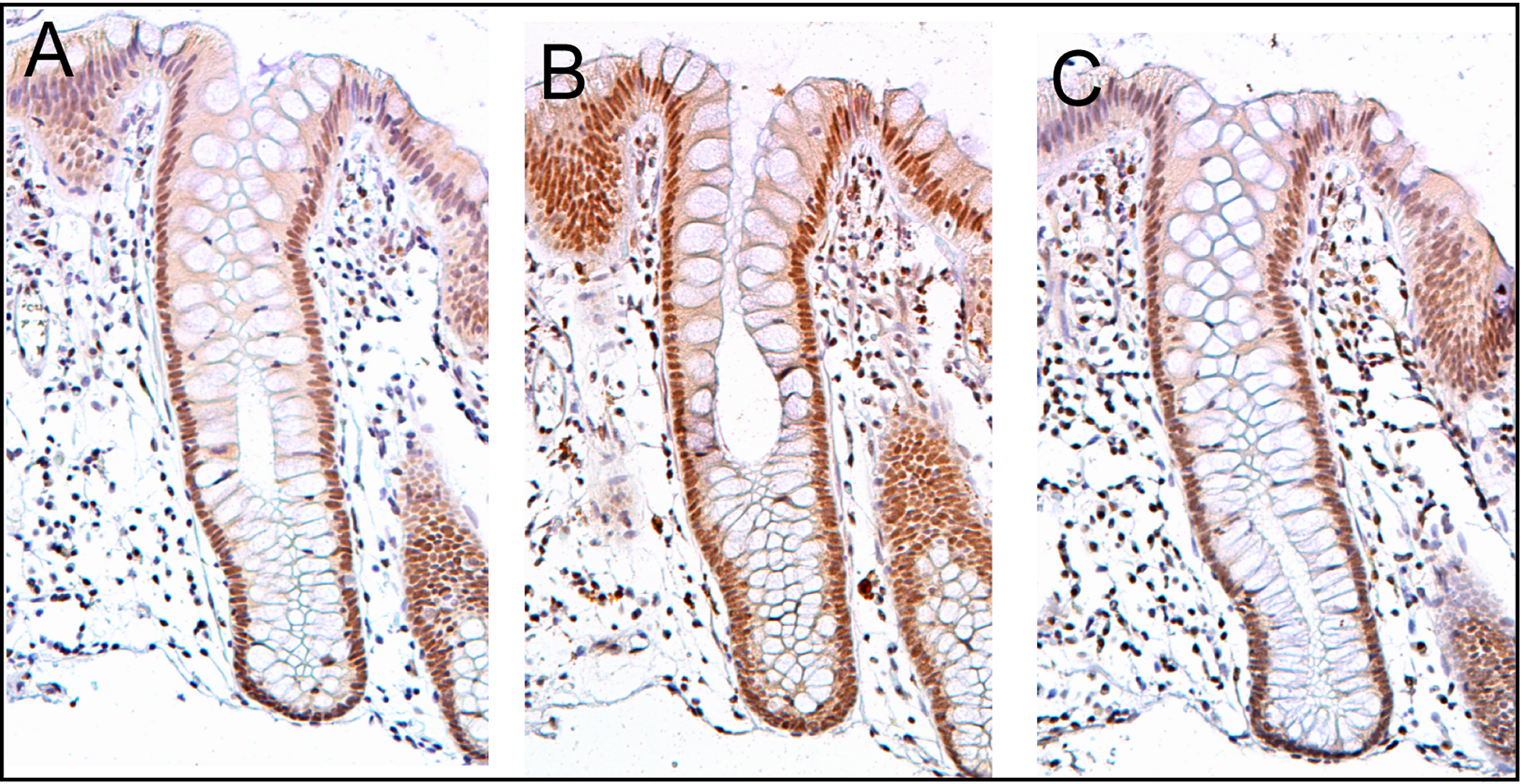
Sequential sections of the same colon crypt with immunohistochemical staining (brown) showing normal high expression of DNA repair proteins PMS2 (A), ERCC1 (B) and ERCC4 (XPF) (C). This crypt is from the biopsy of a 58-year-old male patient who never had colonic neoplasia and the crypt has high expression of these DNA repair proteins in absorptive cell nuclei throughout most of the crypt. Note that PMS2 and ERCC4 (XPF) expression (in panels A and C) are each reduced or absent in the nuclei of cells at the top of the crypt and within the surface of the colonic lumen between crypts. Original image, also in a publication.

ERCC4 (XPF) is normally expressed at a high level in cell nuclei within the inner surface of the colon (see image, panel C). The inner surface of the colon is lined with simple columnar epithelium with invaginations. The invaginations are called intestinal glands or colon crypts. The colon crypts are shaped like microscopic thick walled test tubes with a central hole down the length of the tube (the crypt lumen). Crypts are about 75 to 110 cells long. DNA repair, involving high expression of ERCC4 (XPF), PMS2 and ERCC1 proteins, appears to be very active in colon crypts in normal, non-neoplastic colon epithelium.

Cells are produced at the crypt base and migrate upward along the crypt axis before being shed into the colonic lumen days later. There are 5 to 6 stem cells at the bases of the crypts. There are about 10 million crypts along the inner surface of the average human colon. If the stem cells at the base of the crypt express ERCC4 (XPF), generally all several thousand cells of the crypt will also express ERCC4 (XPF). This is indicated by the brown color seen by immunostaining of ERCC4 (XPF) in almost all the cells in the crypt in panel C of the image in this section. A similar expression of PMS2 and ERCC1 occurs in the thousands of cells in each normal colonic crypt.

The tissue section in the image shown here was also counterstained with hematoxylin to stain DNA in nuclei a blue-gray color. Nuclei of cells in the lamina propria, cells which are below and surround the epithelial crypts, largely show hematoxylin blue-gray color and have little expression of PMS2, ERCC1 or ERCC4 (XPF). In addition, cells at the very tops of the crypts stained for PMS2 (panel A) or ERCC4 (XPF) (panel C) have low levels of these DNA repair proteins, so that such cells show the blue-gray DNA stain as well.

=== ERCC4 (XPF) deficiency in the colon epithelium adjacent to and within cancers ===
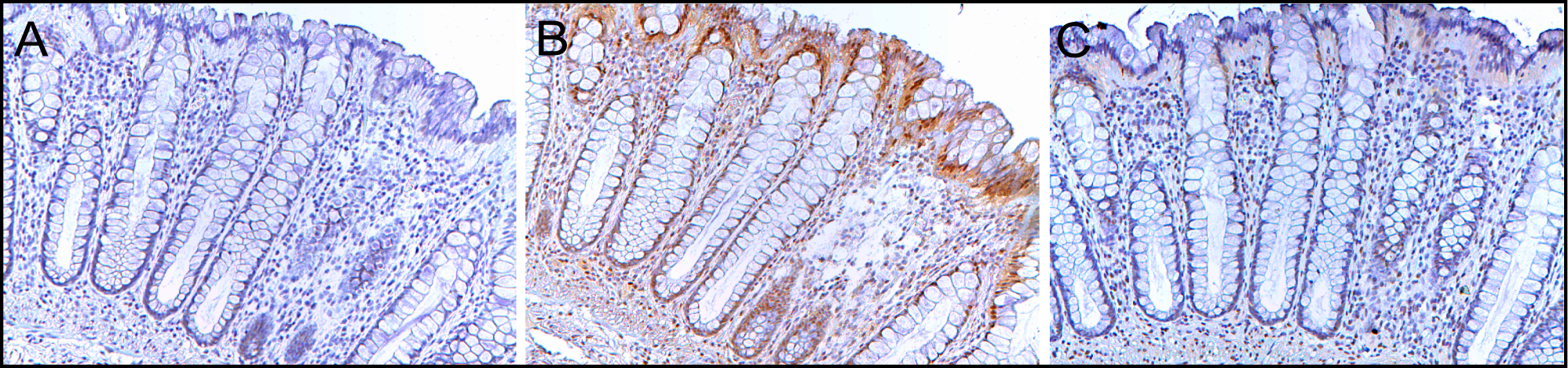
Sequential sections of a segment of colon epithelium near a colorectal cancer showing reduced or absent expression of PMS2 (A), ERCC1 (B) and ERCC4 (C) in the colon crypts. This tissue segment is from a histologically normal area of a colon resection of a male patient who had an adenocarcinoma in the sigmoid colon. For PMS2 (A), there is absent expression in cell nuclei of the crypt body, the crypt neck and the colonic lumen surface for all epithelial cells. For ERCC1 (B), there is reduced expression in most of the cell nuclei of the crypts, but there is high expression in cell nuclei at the neck of the crypts and in the adjacent colonic lumen surface. For ERCC4 (XPF) (C), there is absent expression in most of the cell nuclei of the crypts and in the colonic lumen in this area of tissue, but detectable expression at the neck of some crypts. The reductions or absence of expression of these DNA repair genes in this tissue appears to be due to epigenetic repression. Original image, also in a publication.

ERCC4 (XPF) is deficient in about 55% of colon cancers, and in about 40% of the colon crypts in the epithelium within 10 cm adjacent to the cancers (in the field defects from which the cancers likely arose). When ERCC4 (XPF) is reduced in colonic crypts in a field defect, it is most often associated with reduced expression of DNA repair enzymes ERCC1 and PMS2 as well, as illustrated in the image in this section. Deficiencies in ERCC1 (XPF) in colon epithelium appear to be due to epigenetic repression. A deficiency of ERCC4 (XPF) would lead to reduced repair of DNA damages. As indicated by Harper and Elledge, defects in the ability to properly respond to and repair DNA damage underlie many forms of cancer. The frequent epigenetic reduction in ERCC4 (XPF) in field defects surrounding colon cancers as well as in cancers (along with epigenetic reductions in ERCC1 and PMS2) indicate that such reductions may often play a central role in progression to colon cancer.

Although epigenetic reductions in ERCC4 (XPF) expression are frequent in human colon cancers, mutations in ERCC4 (XPF) are rare in humans. However, a mutation in ERCC4 (XPF) causes patients to be prone to skin cancer. An inherited polymorphism in ERCC4 (XPF) appears to be important in breast cancer as well. These infrequent mutational alterations underscore the likely role of ERCC4 (XPF) deficiency in progression to cancer.
