= ERCC1 =

Protein-coding gene in humans

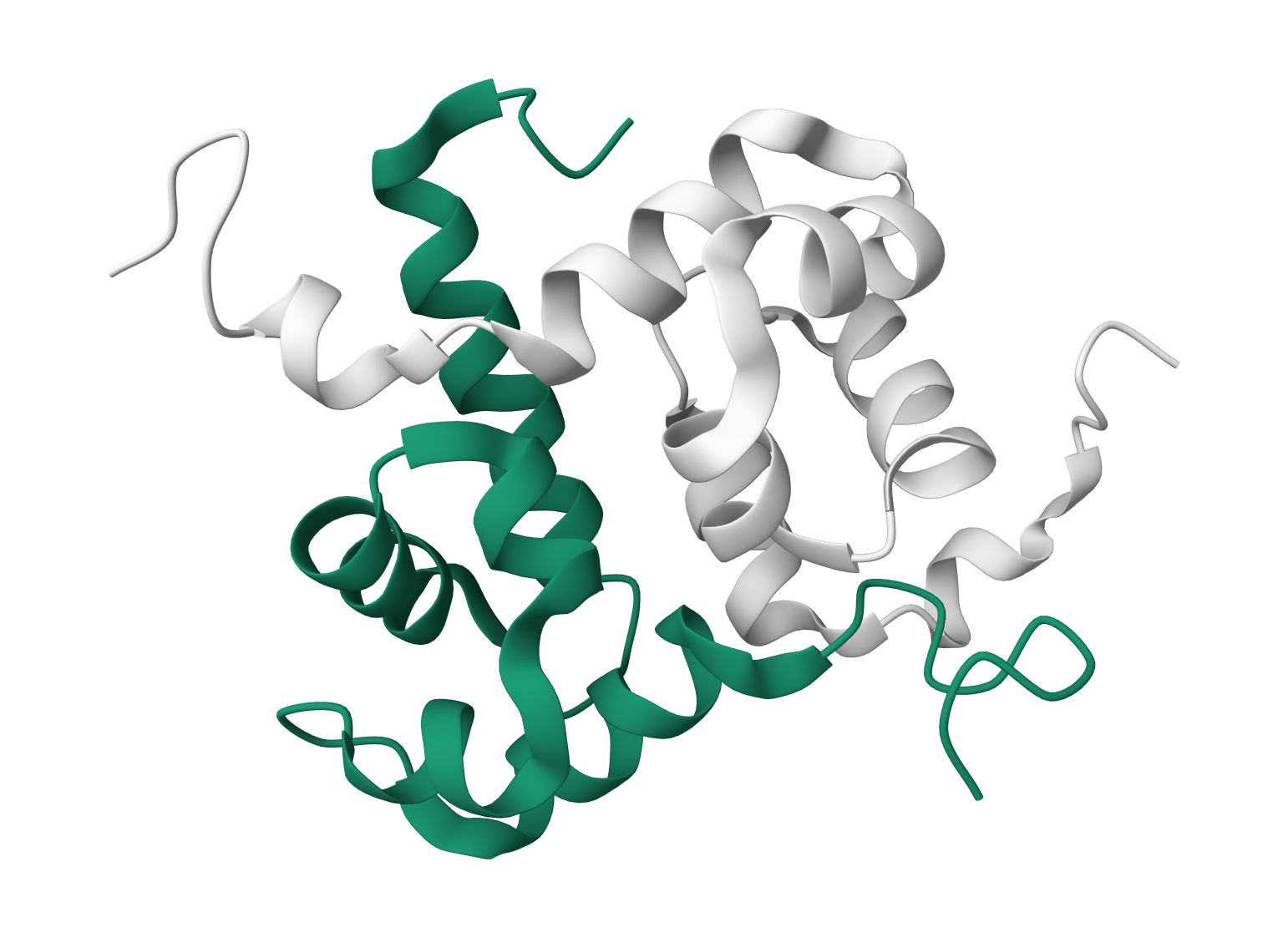

Identifiers
- Aliases: ERCC1, COFS4, RAD10, UV20, excision repair cross-complementation group 1, ERCC excision repair 1, endonuclease non-catalytic subunit
- External IDs: OMIM: 126380; MGI: 95412; GeneCards: ERCC1
Available structures
PDB	Ortholog search: PDBe RCSB
PDB	List of PDB id codes 1Z00, 2A1I, 2A1J, 2JNW, 2JPD, 2MUT

Gene location (Human)
Chr.	Chromosome 19 (human)
Band	19q13.32	Start	45,407,333 bp
Band	19q13.32	End	45,478,828 bp

Gene location (Mouse)
Chr.	Chromosome 7 (mouse)
Band	7 A3|7 9.6 cM	Start	19,078,703 bp
Band	7 A3|7 9.6 cM	End	19,090,449 bp
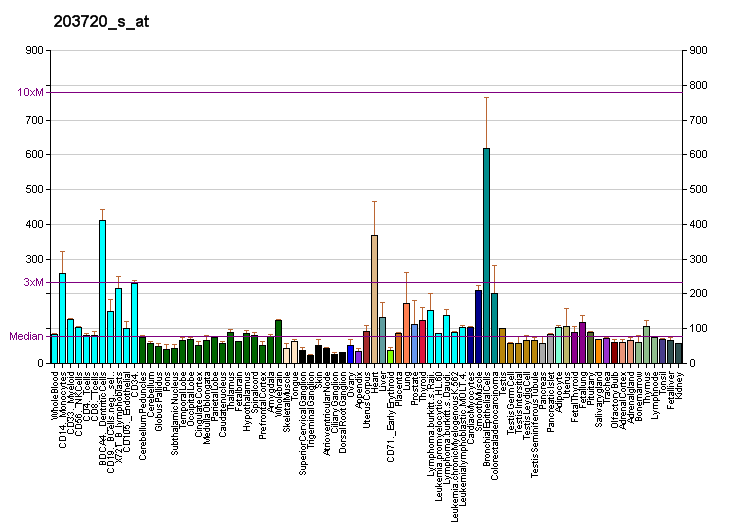

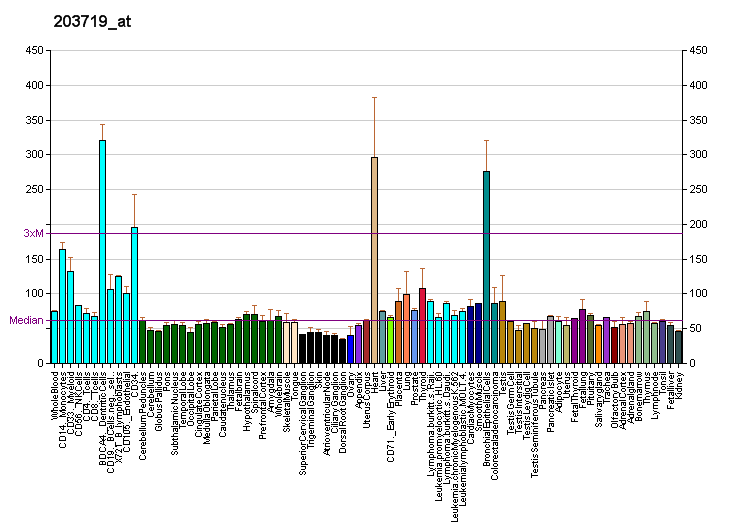
RNA expression pattern
Bgee	Human / Mouse (ortholog); Top expressed in: apex of heart; parotid gland; right auricle of heart; left ventricle; ganglionic eminence; left ovary; ventricular zone; muscle of thigh; right ovary; stromal cell of endometrium / Top expressed in: internal carotid artery; external carotid artery; endothelial cell of lymphatic vessel; fossa; condyle; facial motor nucleus; Rostral migratory stream; vas deferens; muscle of thigh; ankle; More reference expression data
BioGPS	More reference expression data
Gene ontology
Molecular function	protein domain specific binding; single-stranded DNA binding; damaged DNA binding; single-stranded DNA endodeoxyribonuclease activity; protein C-terminus binding; protein binding; TFIID-class transcription factor complex binding; nuclease activity; endonuclease activity; hydrolase activity; 3' overhang single-stranded DNA endodeoxyribonuclease activity; DNA binding
Cellular component	ERCC4-ERCC1 complex; transcription factor TFIID complex; nucleoplasm; nucleotide-excision repair factor 1 complex; nucleotide-excision repair complex; nucleus; cytoplasm; cytosol
Biological process	germ cell development; DNA recombination; male gonad development; interstrand cross-link repair; positive regulation of t-circle formation; cell development; response to nutrient; multicellular organism growth; embryonic organ development; post-embryonic hemopoiesis; syncytium formation; response to oxidative stress; chromosome organization; pyrimidine dimer repair by nucleotide-excision repair; oogenesis; cellular response to DNA damage stimulus; global genome nucleotide-excision repair; isotype switching; spermatogenesis; multicellular organism aging; UV protection; t-circle formation; negative regulation of telomere maintenance; transcription-coupled nucleotide-excision repair; mitotic recombination; cell population proliferation; nucleotide-excision repair, DNA incision; response to X-ray; response to sucrose; nucleotide-excision repair; nucleotide-excision repair, preincision complex stabilization; double-strand break repair; DNA repair; nucleotide-excision repair, DNA incision, 5'-to lesion; nucleotide-excision repair, DNA incision, 3'-to lesion; meiotic mismatch repair; double-strand break repair via nonhomologous end joining; UV-damage excision repair; negative regulation of protection from non-homologous end joining at telomere; telomeric DNA-containing double minutes formation; response to immobilization stress; response to cadmium ion; nucleic acid phosphodiester bond hydrolysis
Sources:Amigo / QuickGO
Orthologs
Databases	NCBI: entry; OMA: entry
Species	Human	Mouse
Entrez	2067	13870
Ensembl	ENSG00000012061	ENSMUSG00000003549
UniProt	P07992	P07903
RefSeq (mRNA)	NM_001166049; NM_001983; NM_202001	NM_001127324; NM_007948
RefSeq (protein)	NP_001159521; NP_001974; NP_973730; NP_001356337; NP_001356338 NP_001356339; NP_001356340; NP_001356341; NP_001356342; NP_001356343; NP_001356344; NP_001356345; NP_001356346; NP_001356347; NP_001356348	NP_001120796; NP_031974
Location (UCSC)	Chr 19: 45.41 – 45.48 Mb	Chr 7: 19.08 – 19.09 Mb
PubMed search
- Wikidata
View/Edit Human	View/Edit Mouse

DNA excision repair protein ERCC-1 is a protein that in humans is encoded by the ERCC1 gene. Together with ERCC4, ERCC1 forms the ERCC1-XPF enzyme complex that participates in DNA repair and DNA recombination.

Many aspects of these two gene products are described together here because they are partners during DNA repair. The ERCC1-XPF nuclease is an essential activity in the pathway of DNA nucleotide excision repair (NER). The ERCC1-XPF nuclease also functions in pathways to repair double-strand breaks in DNA, and in the repair of "crosslink" damage that harmfully links the two DNA strands.

Cells with disabling mutations in ERCC1 are more sensitive than normal to particular DNA damaging agents, including ultraviolet (UV) radiation and to chemicals that cause crosslinking between DNA strands. Genetically engineered mice with disabling mutations in ERCC1 have defects in DNA repair, accompanied by metabolic stress-induced changes in physiology that result in premature aging. Complete deletion of ERCC1 is incompatible with viability of mice, and no human individuals have been found with complete (homozygous) deletion of ERCC1. Rare individuals in the human population harbor inherited mutations that impair the function of ERCC1. When the normal genes are absent, these mutations can lead to human syndromes, including Cockayne syndrome (CS) and COFS.

ERCC1 and ERCC4 are the gene names assigned in mammalian genomes, including the human genome (Homo sapiens). Similar genes with similar functions are found in all eukaryotic organisms.

== Gene ==
The genomic DNA for ERCC1 was the first human DNA repair gene to be isolated by molecular cloning. The original method was by transfer of fragments of the human genome to ultraviolet light (UV)-sensitive mutant cell lines derived from Chinese hamster ovary cells. Reflecting this cross-species genetic complementation method, the gene was called "Excision repair cross-complementing 1". Multiple independent complementation groups of Chinese hamster ovary (CHO) cells were isolated, and this gene restored UV resistance to cells of complementation group 1.

The human ERCC1 gene encodes the ERCC1 protein of 297 amino acids with a molecular mass of about 32,500 daltons.

Genes similar to ERCC1 with equivalent functions (orthologs) are found in other eukaryotic genomes. Some of the most studied gene orthologs include RAD10 in the budding yeast Saccharomyces cerevisiae, and swi10+ in the fission yeast Schizosaccharomyces pombe.

== Protein ==
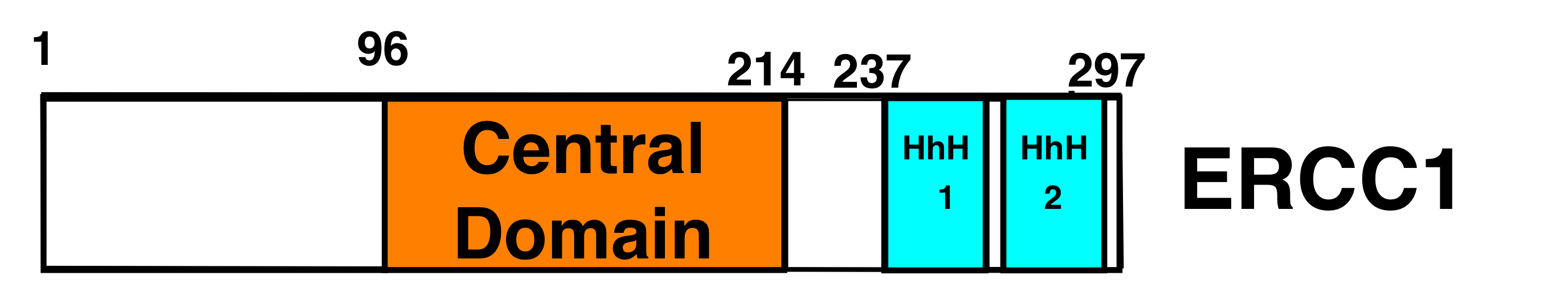
Diagram of ERCC1 showing a central domain and a helix-hairpin-helix domain

One ERCC1 molecule and one XPF molecule bind together, forming an ERCC1-XPF heterodimer which is the active nuclease form of the enzyme. In the ERCC1–XPF heterodimer, ERCC1 mediates DNA– and protein–protein interactions. XPF provides the endonuclease active site and is involved in DNA binding and additional protein–protein interactions.

The ERCC4/XPF protein consists of two conserved domains separated by a less conserved region in the middle. The N-terminal region has homology to several conserved domains of DNA helicases belonging to superfamily II, although XPF is not a DNA helicase. The C-terminal region of XPF includes the active site residues for nuclease activity. Most of the ERCC1 protein is related at the sequence level to the C-terminus of the XPF protein, but residues in the nuclease domain are not present. A DNA binding "helix-hairpin-helix" domain at the C-terminus of each protein.

By primary sequence and protein structural similarity, the ERCC1-XPF nuclease is a member of a broader family of structure specific DNA nucleases comprising two subunits. Such nucleases include, for example, the MUS81-EME1 nuclease.

== Structure-specific nuclease ==
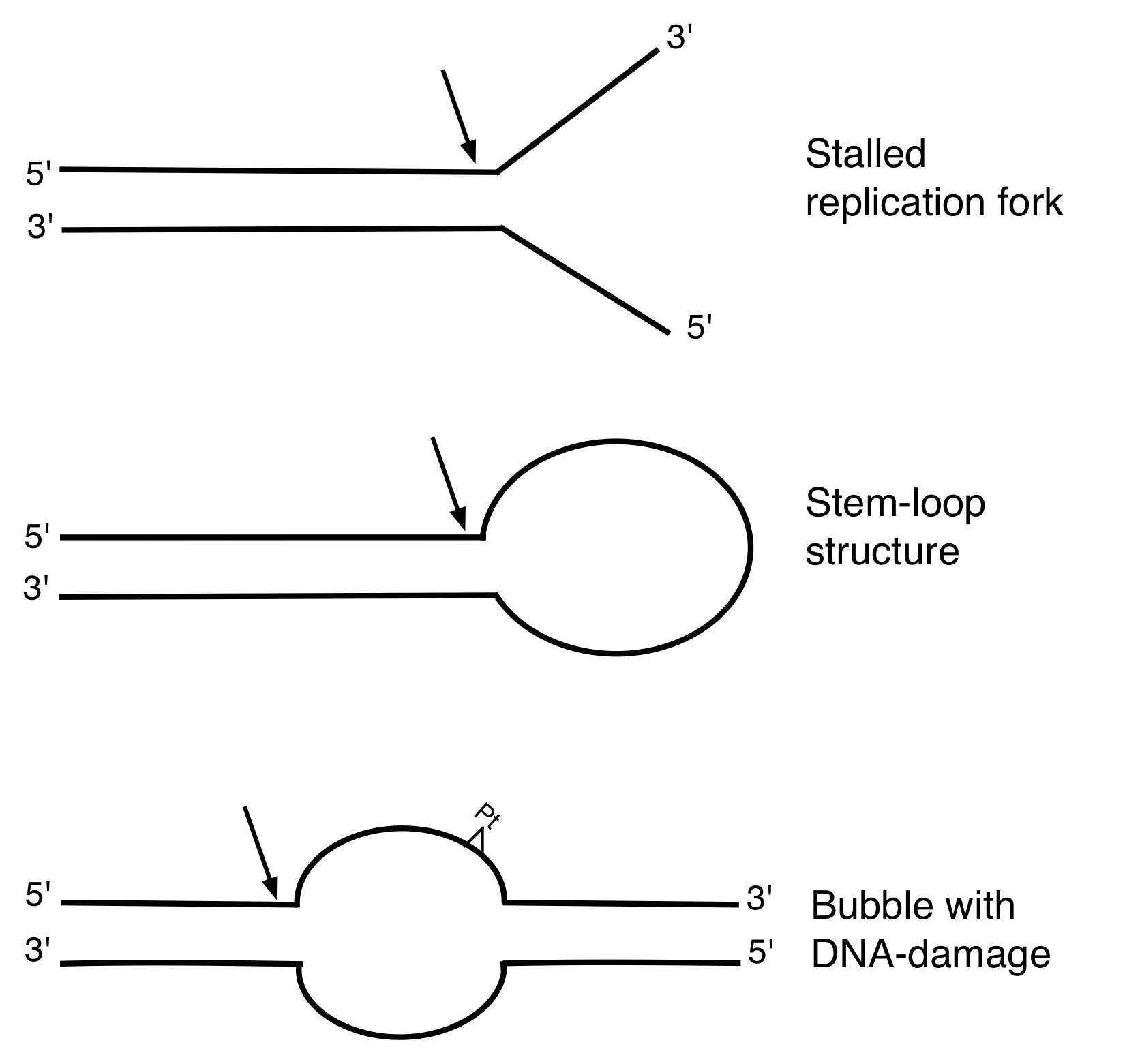
DNA substrates of ERCC1-XPF nuclease

The ERCC1–XPF complex is a structure-specific endonuclease. ERCC1-XPF does not cut DNA that is exclusively single-stranded or double-stranded, but it cleaves the DNA phosphodiester backbone specifically at junctions between double-stranded and single-stranded DNA. It introduces a cut in double-stranded DNA on the 5′ side of such a junction, about two nucleotides away. This structure-specificity was initially demonstrated for RAD10-RAD1, the yeast orthologs of ERCC1 and XPF.

The hydrophobic helix–hairpin–helix motifs in the C-terminal regions of ERCC1 and XPF interact to promote dimerization of the two proteins. There is no catalytic activity in the absence of dimerization. Indeed, although the catalytic domain is within XPF and ERCC1 is catalytically inactive, ERCC1 is indispensable for activity of the complex.

Several models have been proposed for binding of ERCC1–XPF to DNA, based on partial structures of relevant protein fragments at atomic resolution. DNA binding mediated by the helix-hairpin-helix domains of ERCC1 and XPF domains positions the heterodimer at the junction between double-stranded and single-stranded DNA.

=== Nucleotide excision repair ===
During nucleotide excision repair, several protein complexes cooperate to recognize damaged DNA and locally separate the DNA helix for a short distance on either side of the site of a DNA damage. The ERCC1–XPF nuclease incises the damaged DNA strand on the 5′ side of the lesion. During NER, the ERCC1 protein interacts with the XPA protein to coordinate DNA and protein binding.

=== DNA double-strand break repair ===
Mammalian cells with mutant ERCC1–XPF are moderately more sensitive than normal cells to agents (such as ionizing radiation) that cause double-stranded breaks in DNA. Particular pathways of both homologous recombination repair and non-homologous end-joining rely on ERCC1-XPF function. The relevant activity of ERCC1–XPF for both types of double-strand break repair is the ability to remove non-homologous 3′ single-stranded tails from DNA ends before rejoining. This activity is needed during a single-strand annealing subpathway of homologous recombination. Trimming of 3' single-stranded tail is also needed in a mechanistically distinct subpathway of non-homologous end-joining, dependent on the Ku proteins. Homologous integration of DNA, an important technique for genetic manipulation, is dependent on the function of ERCC1-XPF in the host cell.

=== DNA interstrand crosslink repair ===
Mammalian cells carrying mutations in ERCC1 or XPF are especially sensitive to agents that cause DNA interstrand crosslinks. Interstrand crosslinks block the progression of DNA replication, and structures at blocked DNA replication forks provide substrates for cleavage by ERCC1-XPF. Incisions may be made on either side of the crosslink on one DNA strand to unhook the crosslink and initiate repair. Alternatively, a double-strand break may be made in the DNA near the ICL, and subsequent homologous recombination repair may involve ERCC1-XPF action. Although not the only nuclease involved, ERCC1–XPF is required for ICL repair during several phases of the cell cycle.

== Clinical significance ==
=== Cerebro-oculo-facio-skeletal syndrome ===
A few patients with severely disabling ERCC1 mutations that cause cerebro-oculo-facio-skeletal syndrome (COFS) have been reported. COFS syndrome is a rare recessive disorder in which affected individuals undergo rapid neurologic decline and indications of accelerated aging. A very severe case of such disabling mutations is F231L mutation in the tandem helix-hairpin-helix domain of ERCC1 at its interface with XPF. It is shown that this single mutation is very important for the stability of the ERCC1-XPF complex. This Phenylalanine residue is assisting ERCC1 to accommodate a key Phenylalanine residue from XPF (F894) and the mutation (F231L) disturbs this accommodating function. As a consequence, F894 protrudes out of the interface and the mutant complex is dissociating faster compared to the native one. The life span of patients with such mutations is often around 1–2 years.

=== Cockayne syndrome ===
One Cockayne syndrome (CS) type II patient designated CS20LO exhibited a homozygous mutation in exon 7 of ERCC1, producing a F231L mutation.

=== Relevance in chemotherapy ===
Measuring ERCC1 activity may have utility in clinical cancer medicine because one mechanism of resistance to platinum chemotherapy drugs correlates with high ERCC1 activity. Nucleotide excision repair (NER) is the primary DNA repair mechanism that removes the therapeutic platinum-DNA adducts from the tumor DNA. ERCC1 activity levels, being an important part of the NER common final pathway, may serve as a marker of general NER throughput. This has been suggested for patients with gastric, ovarian and bladder cancers. In non-small cell lung carcinoma (NSCLC), surgically removed tumors that receive no further therapy have a better survival if ERCC1-positive than if ERCC1-negative. Thus, ERCC1 positivity is a favorable prognostic marker, referring to how the disease will proceed if not further treated. ERCC1-positive NSCLC tumors do not benefit from adjuvant platinum chemotherapy. However, ERCC1-negative NSCLC tumors, prognostically worse without treatment, derive substantial benefit from adjuvant cisplatin-based chemotherapy. High ERCC1 is thus a negative predictive marker, referring to how it will respond to a specific type of treatment. In colorectal cancer, clinical trials have not demonstrated the predictive ability of ERCC1 in oxaliplatin‐based treatment. Thus, European Society for Medical Oncology (ESMO) has not recommended ERCC1 testing prior to the use of oxaliplatin in routine practice. ERCC1 genotyping in humans has shown significant polymorphism at codon 118. These polymorphisms may have differential effects on platinum and mitomycin damage.

=== Deficiency in cancer ===
ERCC1 protein expression is reduced or absent in 84–100% of colorectal cancers, and lower expression of ERCC1 has been reported as being associated with unfavorable prognosis in patients undergoing treatment with oxaliplatin. The promoter of ERCC1 is methylated in 38% of gliomas, resulting in reduced mRNA and protein expression. The promoter of ERCC1 was located in the DNA 5 kilobases upstream of the protein coding region. Frequencies of epigenetic reductions of nine other DNA repair genes have been evaluated in various cancers and range from 2% (OGG1 in papillary thyroid cancer) to 88% and 90% (MGMT in gastric and colon cancers, respectively). Thus, reduction of protein expression of ERCC1 in 84–100% of colon cancers indicates that reduced ERCC1 is one of the most frequent reductions of a DNA repair gene observed in a cancer. Deficiency in ERCC1 protein expression appears to be an early event in colon carcinogenesis, since ERCC1 was found to be deficient in 40% of the crypts within 10 cm on each side of colonic adenocarcinomas (within the early field defects from which the cancers likely arose).

Cadmium (Cd) and its compounds are well-known human carcinogens. During Cd-induced malignant transformation, the promoter regions of ERCC1, as well as of hMSH2, XRCC1, and hOGG1, were heavily methylated and both the messenger RNA and proteins of these DNA repair genes were progressively reduced. DNA damage also increased with Cd-induced transformation. Reduction of protein expression of ERCC1 in progression to sporadic cancer is unlikely to be due to mutation. While germ line (familial) mutations in DNA repair genes cause a high risk of cancer (see inherited impairment in DNA repair increases cancer risk), somatic mutations in DNA repair genes, including ERCC1, only occur at low levels in sporadic (non-familial) cancers.

Control of ERCC1 protein level occurred at the translational level. In addition to the wild-type sequence, three splice variants of mRNA ERCC1 exist. ERCC1 mRNA is also found to have either wild-type or three alternative transcription start points. Neither the level of overall mRNA transcription, splice variation nor transcription start point of mRNA correlates with protein level of ERCC1. The rate of ERCC1 protein turnover also does not correlate with ERCC1 protein level. A translational level control of ERCC1, due to a microRNA (miRNA), has been shown during HIV viral infection. A trans-activation response element (TAR) miRNA, coded for by the HIV virus, down-regulates ERCC1 protein expression. TAR miRNA allows ERCC1 mRNA to be transcribed, but acts at the p-body level to prevent translation of ERCC1 protein. (A p-body is a cytoplasmic granule "processing body" that interacts with miRNAs to repress translation or trigger degradation of target RNAs.) In breast cancer cell lines, almost one third (55/167) of miRNA promoters were targets for aberrant methylation (epigenetic repression). In breast cancers themselves, methylation of let-7a-3/let-7b miRNA in particular was found. This indicates that let-7a-3/let-7b can be epigenetically repressed.

Repression of let-7a can cause repression of ERCC1 expression through an intermediary step involving the HMGA2 gene. The let-7a miRNA normally represses the HMGA2 gene, and in normal adult tissues, almost no HMGA2 protein is present. (See also Let-7 microRNA precursor.) Reduction or absence of let-7a miRNA allows high expression of the HMGA2 protein. HMGA proteins are characterized by three DNA-binding domains, called AT-hooks, and an acidic carboxy-terminal tail. HMGA proteins are chromatin architectural transcription factors that both positively and negatively regulate the transcription of a variety of genes. They do not display direct transcriptional activation capacity, but regulate gene expression by changing local DNA conformation. Regulation is achieved by binding to AT-rich regions in the DNA and/or direct interaction with several transcription factors. HMGA2 targets and modifies the chromatin architecture at the ERCC1 gene, reducing its expression. Hypermethylation of the promoter for let-7a miRNA reduces its expression and this allows hyperexpression of HMGA2. Hyperexpression of HMGA2 can then reduce expression of ERCC1.

Thus, there are three mechanisms that may be responsible for the low level of protein expression of ERCC1 in 84–100% of sporadic colon cancers. From results in gliomas and in cadmium carcinogenesis, methylation of the ERCC1 promoter may be a factor. One or more miRNAs that repress ERCC1 may be a factor. And epigenetically reduced let-7a miRNA allowing hyperexpression of HMGA2 could also reduce protein expression of ERCC1 in colon cancers. Which epigenetic mechanism occurs most frequently, or whether multiple epigenetic mechanisms reduce ERCC1 protein expression in colon cancers has not been determined.

== Accelerated aging ==
DNA repair–deficient Ercc1 mutant mice show numerous features of accelerated aging, and have a limited lifespan. Accelerated aging in the mutant involves various organs. Ercc1 mutant mice are deficient in several DNA repair processes including transcription-coupled DNA repair. This deficiency prevents resumption of RNA synthesis on the template DNA strand subsequent to it receiving a transcription-blocking DNA damage. Such blockages of transcription appear to promote premature aging, particularly in non-proliferating or slowly proliferating organs such as the nervous system, liver and kidney (see DNA damage theory of aging).

When Ercc1 mutant mice were subjected to dietary restriction their response closely resembled the beneficial response to dietary restriction of wild-type mice. Dietary restriction extended the lifespan of the Ercc1 mutant mice from 10 to 35 weeks for males and from 13 to 39 weeks for females. It appears that in Ercc1 mutant mice dietary restriction while delaying aging also attenuates accumulation of genome-wide DNA damage and preserves transcriptional output, likely contributing to improved cell viability.

== Spermatogenesis and oogenesis ==
Both male and female Ercc1-deficient mice are infertile. The DNA repair function of Ercc1 appears to be required in both male and female germ cells at all stages of their maturation. The testes of Ercc1-deficient mice have an increased level of 8-oxoguanine in their DNA, suggesting that Ercc1 may have a role in removing oxidative DNA damages.

== Macular degeneration ==
Age-related macular degeneration (AMD) of the retina is the leading cause of blindness in people over age fifty. The retina is the highest oxygen consuming tissue in the human body and thus prone to oxidative damages. An Ercc1 mutant mouse model depleted in expression the DNA repair enzyme ERCC1-XPF was found to undergo accelerated retinal degeneration suggesting that spontaneous DNA damage may be a key factor in age-related retinal degeneration.
